= 1919 =

1919 in various calendars
- Gregorian calendar: 1919; MCMXIX
- Ab urbe condita: 2672
- Armenian calendar: 1368; ԹՎ ՌՅԿԸ
- Assyrian calendar: 6669
- Baháʼí calendar: 75–76
- Balinese saka calendar: 1840–1841
- Bengali calendar: 1325–1326
- Berber calendar: 2869
- British Regnal year: 9 Geo. 5 – 10 Geo. 5
- Buddhist calendar: 2463
- Burmese calendar: 1281
- Byzantine calendar: 7427–7428
- Chinese calendar: 戊午年 (Earth Horse); 4616 or 4409 — to — 己未年 (Earth Goat); 4617 or 4410
- Coptic calendar: 1635–1636
- Discordian calendar: 3085
- Ethiopian calendar: 1911–1912
- Hebrew calendar: 5679–5680
- Hindu calendars
- Vikram Samvat: 1975–1976
- Shaka Samvat: 1840–1841
- Kali Yuga: 5019–5020
- Holocene calendar: 11919
- Igbo calendar: 919–920
- Iranian calendar: 1297–1298
- Islamic calendar: 1337–1338
- Japanese calendar: Taishō 8 (大正８年)
- Javanese calendar: 1849–1850
- Juche calendar: 8
- Julian calendar: Gregorian minus 13 days
- Korean calendar: 4252
- Minguo calendar: ROC 8 民國8年
- Nanakshahi calendar: 451
- Thai solar calendar: 2461–2462
- Tibetan calendar: ས་ཕོ་རྟ་ལོ་ (male Earth-Horse); 2045 or 1664 or 892 — to — ས་མོ་ལུག་ལོ་ (female Earth-Sheep); 2046 or 1665 or 893

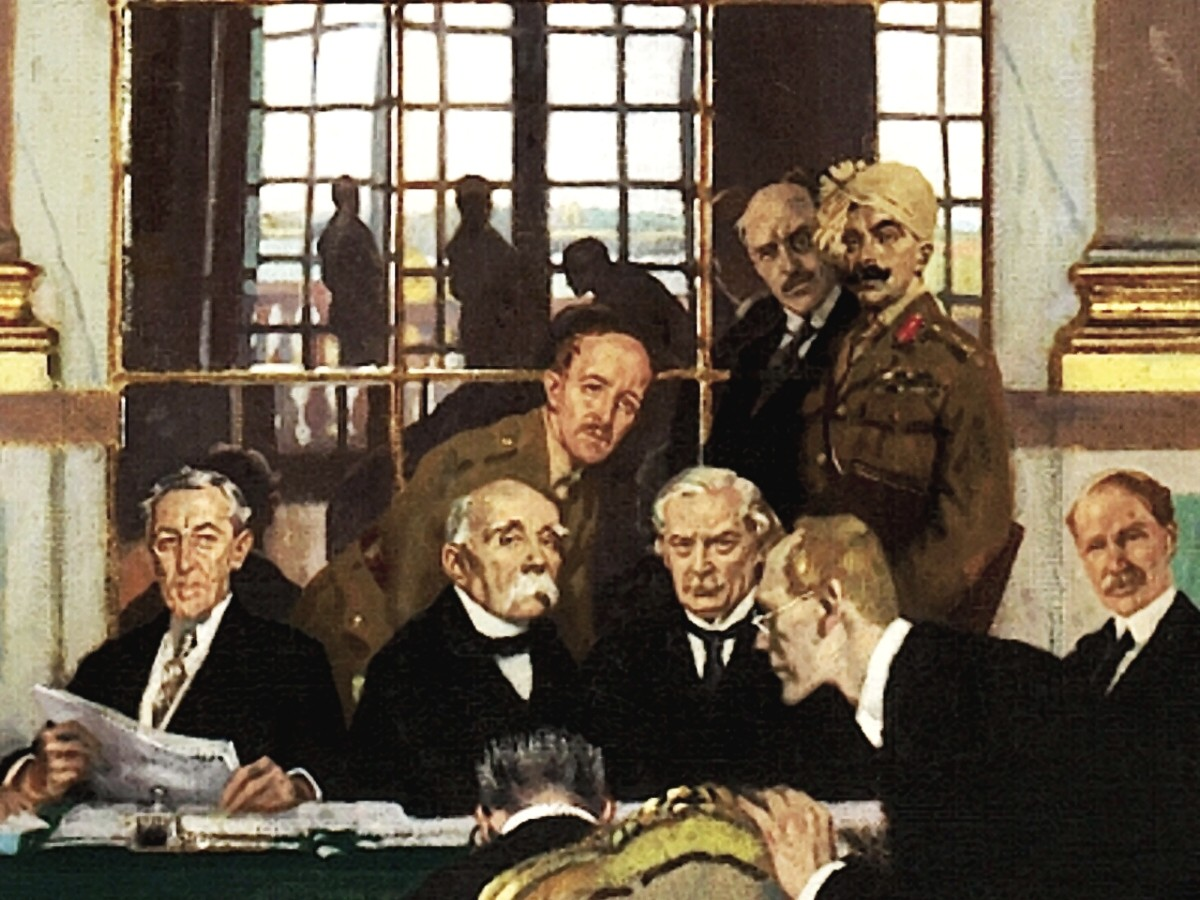
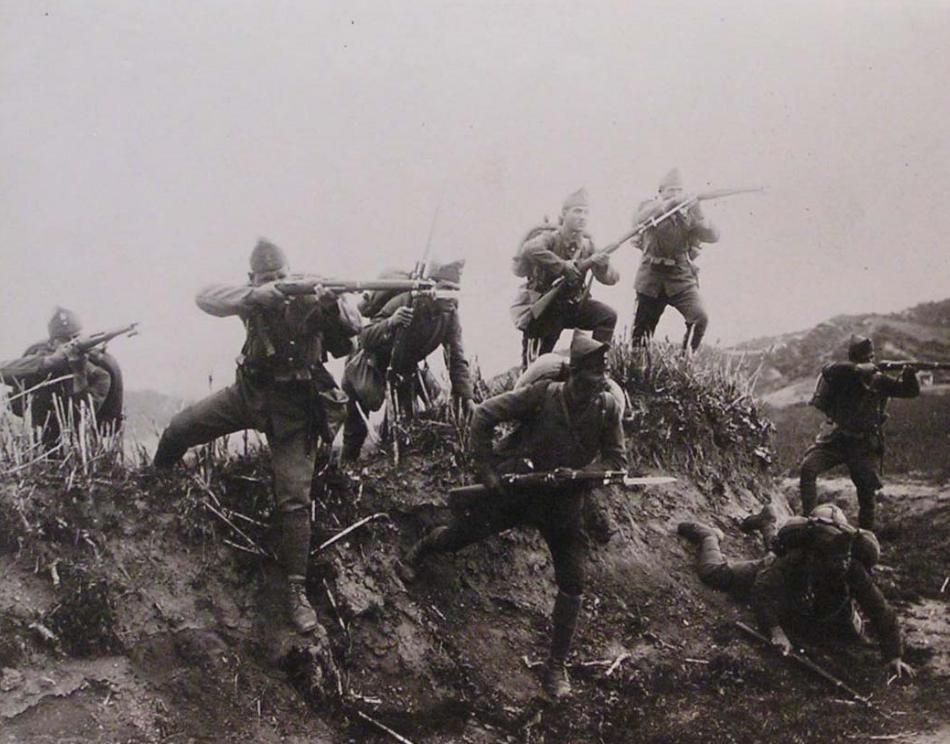
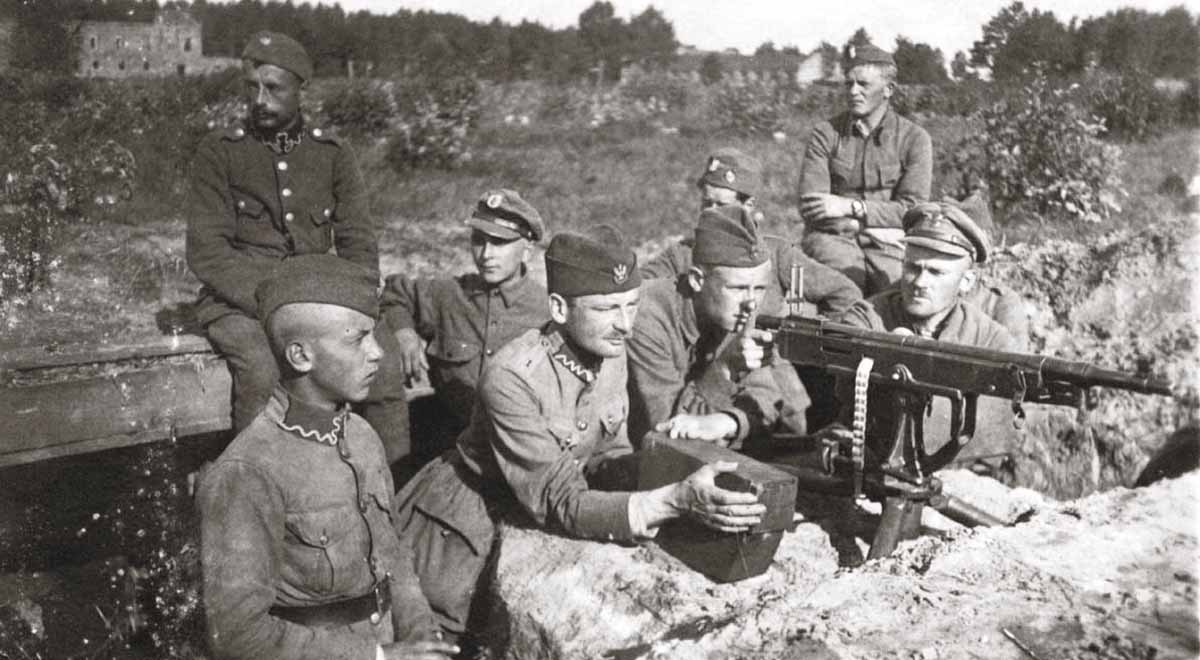
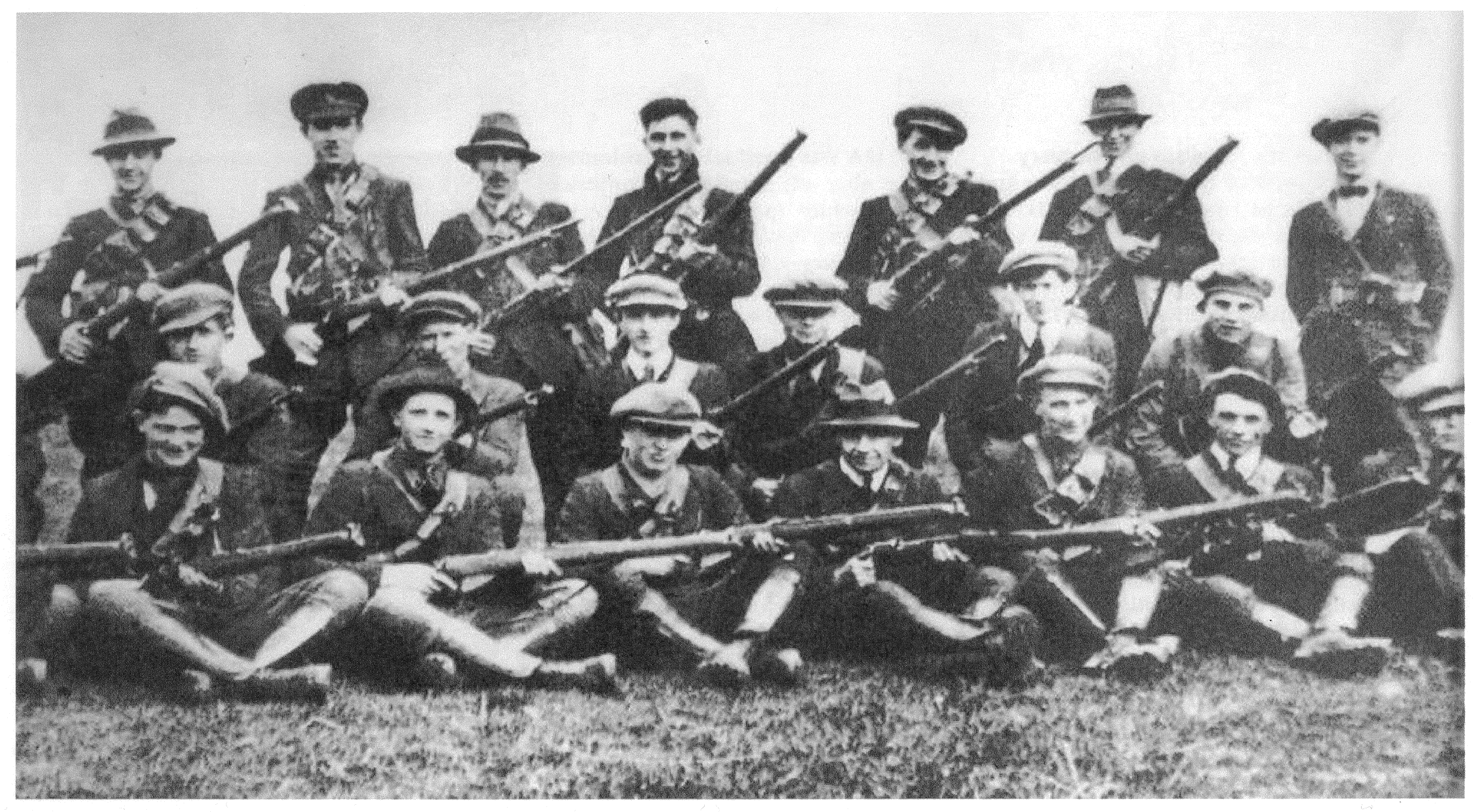
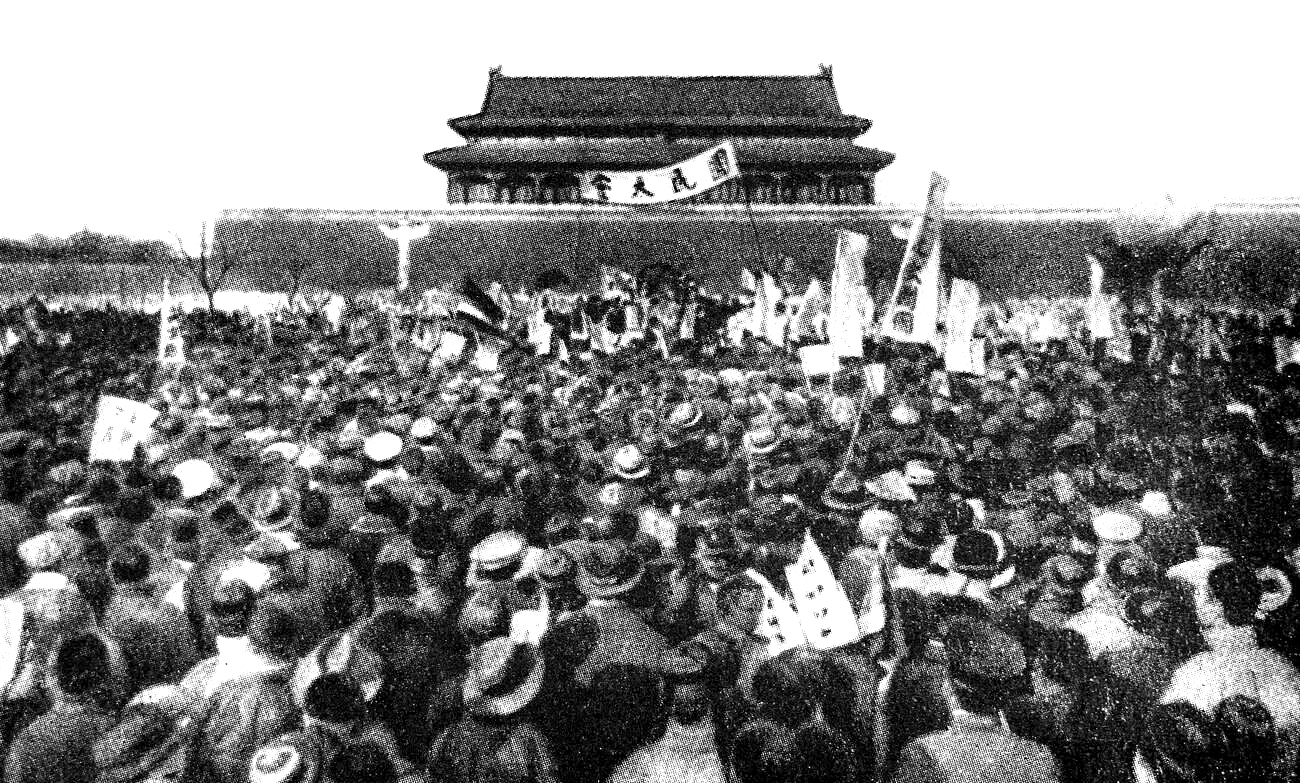
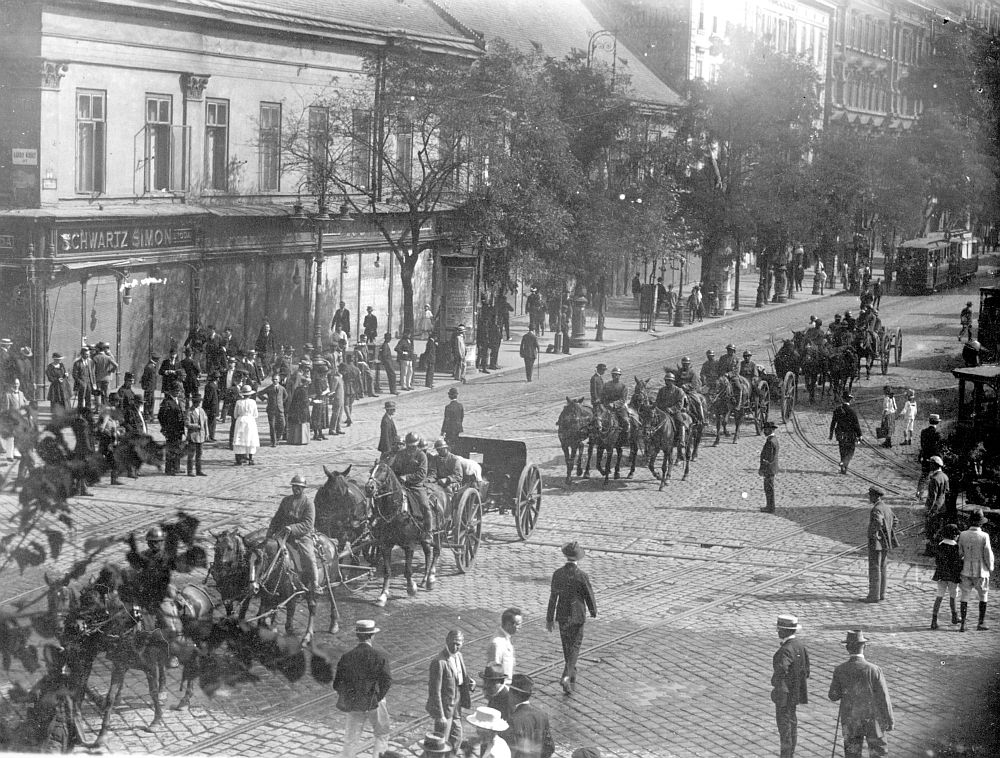
From top to bottom, left to right:
- The Treaty of Versailles ends World War I between Germany and Allied Powers, imposing reparations and redrawing borders;
- The Greco-Turkish War begins as Greece invades Anatolia, sparking the Turkish War of Independence;
- The Polish–Soviet War erupts over borderlands between Poland and Soviet Russia;
- The Irish War of Independence starts as the Irish Republican Army fights British rule;
- The May Fourth Movement rises in China against imperialism and Japanese encroachment;
- The Hungarian Soviet Republic briefly becomes Europe’s first communist state before falling in the Hungarian–Romanian War.

1919 (MCMXIX) was a common year starting on Wednesday of the Gregorian calendar and a common year starting on Tuesday of the Julian calendar, the 1919th year of the Common Era (CE) and Anno Domini (AD) designations, the 919th year of the 2nd millennium, the 19th year of the 20th century, and the 10th and last year of the 1910s decade. As of the start of 1919, the Gregorian calendar was 13 days ahead of the Julian calendar, which remained in localized use until 1923.

== Events ==
=== January ===
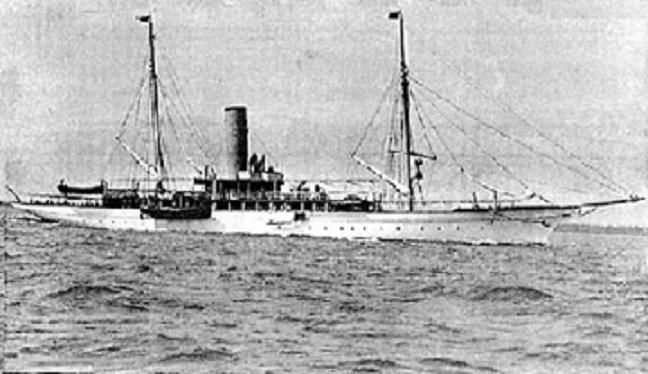
January 1: Iolaire sinks.

- January 1
  - The Czechoslovak Legions occupy much of the self-proclaimed "free city" of Pressburg (later Bratislava), enforcing its incorporation into the new republic of Czechoslovakia.
  - HMY Iolaire sinks off the coast of the Hebrides; 201 people, mostly servicemen returning home to Lewis and Harris, are killed.
- January 2–22 – Russian Civil War: The Red Army's Caspian-Caucasian Front begins the Northern Caucasus Operation against the White Army, but fails to make progress.
- January 3 – The Faisal–Weizmann Agreement is signed by Emir Faisal (representing the Arab Kingdom of Hejaz) and Zionist leader Chaim Weizmann, for Arab–Jewish cooperation in the development of a Jewish homeland in Palestine, and an Arab nation in a large part of the Middle East.
- January 5 – In Germany:
  - Spartacist uprising in Berlin: The Marxist Spartacus League, with the newly formed Communist Party of Germany and the Independent Social Democratic Party, begin mass demonstrations, which will be suppressed by armed force within a week.
  - The German Workers' Party (Deutsche Arbeiterpartei, DAP), predecessor of the Nazi Party, is formed by the merger of Anton Drexler's Committee of Independent Workmen with journalist Karl Harrer's Political Workers' Circle.
- January 7 – Estonian War of Independence: With Soviet Russian forces just 40 km outside of the capital Tallinn, Estonian forces start a general and successful counter-offensive against the Red Army.
- January 8 – The funeral of Theodore Roosevelt, 26th President of the United States, is held at Christ Church Oyster Bay, Long Island; Roosevelt had died in his sleep at the age of 60, two days earlier.
- January 8–22 – Russian Civil War, Southern Front: The Red Army attacks and defeats the White Don Army under Pyotr Krasnov in the Voronezh–Povorino Operation.
- January 9
  - Friedrich Ebert orders the Freikorps into action in Berlin.
  - Estonian War of Independence: Battle of Tapa – Estonian forces liberate Tapa, Estonia, from the Red Army.
  - A group of socialist and liberal deputies table a motion to make Luxembourg a republic. A crowd gathers at the barracks of the Corps of Volunteers, close to the Chamber. A crowd led by Émile Servais, a left-wing politician, rushes the Chamber and soldiers refuse to disperse them. A Committee of Public Safety is formed, but the rebellion is quelled by the French Army under General de La Tour.
- January 10–12 – The Freikorps attacks Spartacist supporters around Berlin.
- January 11
  - Romania annexes Transylvania.
  - The Georgian genocide occurs in Alagir.
- January 12–May 19 – Russian Civil War: On the Southern Front, the Armed Forces of South Russia under General Anton Denikin fight against the Red Army for the possession of the strategic region of the Donbass.
- January 13 – Workers' councils in Berlin end the general strike; the Spartacist uprising is over.
- January 14 – Estonian War of Independence: Estonian forces liberate Tartu from the Red Army.
- January 15
  - Rosa Luxemburg and Karl Liebknecht are murdered following the Spartacist uprising.
  - Great Molasses Flood: A wave of molasses released from an exploding storage tank sweeps through Boston, Massachusetts, killing 21 people and injuring 150.
- January 16
  - The Eighteenth Amendment to the United States Constitution, authorizing Prohibition, is ratified.
  - Pianist Ignacy Jan Paderewski becomes the second Prime Minister of Poland.
- January 18
  - The Paris Peace Conference opens in France, with delegates from 27 nations attending for meetings at the Palace of Versailles.
  - Estonian War of Independence: Estonian forces liberate Narva, expelling the Red Army from Northern Estonia.
  - Bentley Motors Limited is founded in England.
- January 19–28 – Russian Civil War: The Red Army begins the counter offensive in the Perm area against the White forces.
- January 19
  - The Monarchy of the North is established in Northern Portugal.
  - 1919 German federal election, first under the Weimar Republic and the first in Germany with female suffrage.
- January 21 – Dáil Éireann meets for the first time in the Mansion House, Dublin. It comprises Sinn Féin members elected in the 1918 general election who, in accordance with their manifesto, have not taken their seats in the Parliament of the United Kingdom, but chosen to declare an independent Irish Republic. In the first shots of the Anglo-Irish War, two Royal Irish Constabulary (RIC) men are killed in an ambush at Soloheadbeg, County Tipperary.
- January 23 – Khotyn Uprising: pro-Ukrainian partisans capture the city of Khotyn in Romania.
- January 25 – The League of Nations is founded in Paris, France.
- January 31 – Battle of George Square: The British Army is called in to deal with riots, during negotiations over working hours in Glasgow, Scotland.

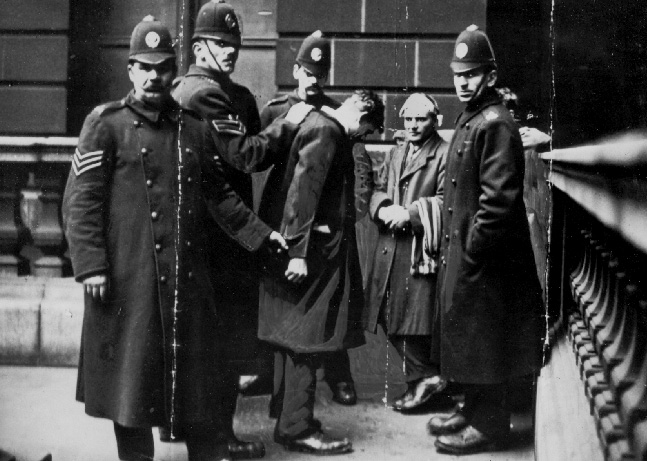
David Kirkwood being detained by police during the Battle of George Square

=== February ===
- February 1 – Estonian War of Independence: Estonian forces liberate Valga and Võru, expelling the Red Army from the entire territory of Estonia.
- February 3 – Russian Civil War: Soviet troops occupy Ukraine.
- February 4–5 – Pressburg (Bratislava) becomes the capital of Slovakia.
- February 5
  - United Artists (UA) is incorporated in the United States by D. W. Griffith, Charlie Chaplin, Mary Pickford and Douglas Fairbanks as a motion picture producer.
  - Russian Civil War: Soviet troops occupy the city of Kyiv after the Battle of Kiev (January).
- February 10 – The Inter-Allied Women's Conference convenes to compile a list of women's issues to present to the delegates of the Paris Peace Conference.
- February 11
  - Friedrich Ebert is elected the first President of Germany (Reichspräsident), by the Weimar National Assembly.
  - The Seattle General Strike ends, when Federal troops are summoned by the State of Washington's Attorney General.
- February 12 – Ethnic Germans and Hungarian inhabitants of Pressburg start a protest against its incorporation into Czechoslovakia, but the Czechoslovak Legions open fire on the unarmed demonstrators.
- February 13 – Portugal's Monarchy of the North ends as a result of a revolt in Porto by civilians and National Republican Guard members.
- February 14 – The Polish–Soviet War begins, with the Battle of Bereza Kartuska.
- February 16–21 – Estonian War of Independence: Uniformed peasants in Saaremaa rebel against the government of Estonia; the rebellion is crushed by government forces, leaving more than 200 dead.
- February 25 – Oregon places a one cent per US gallon (0.26¢/liter) tax on gasoline, becoming the first U.S. state to levy a gasoline tax.
- February 26 – Grand Canyon National Park: An act of the United States Congress establishes most of the Grand Canyon as a United States National Park.
- February 28
  - Amānullāh Khān becomes King of Afghanistan.
  - An independence mission to the U.S., funded by the Philippine legislature, sets out from Manila to present its case to United States Secretary of War Newton D. Baker.

=== March ===
- March 1 – The March 1st Movement against Japanese colonial rule in Korea is formed.
- March 2 – The Founding Congress of the Comintern opens in Moscow.
- March 3–April – Russian Civil War: Beginning of the Chapan War as peasants of the provinces of Samara and Simbirsk rebel against Soviet rule.
- March 4
  - The Communist International (Comintern) is founded.
  - Russian Civil War: The White forces in Siberia under the command of Admiral Alexander Kolchak attack the positions of the Red Army in the Spring Offensive. The Whites crush the 5th Red Army under Jan Blumberg, and capture Okhansk, Osa, Sarapul and finally Ufa over the next days.
- March 4–5 – Kinmel Park Riots by troops of the Canadian Expeditionary Force awaiting repatriation at Kinmel Camp, Bodelwyddan, in North Wales. Five men are killed, 28 injured, and 25 convicted of mutiny.
- March 5 – A. Mitchell Palmer becomes United States Attorney General, through recess appointment.
- March 8
  - The Rowlatt Act is passed by the Imperial Legislative Council in London, indefinitely extending the emergency provisions of the Defence of India Act 1915.
  - British authorities in Egypt arrest populist leader Saad Zaghloul, exiling him to Malta, triggering the Egyptian Revolution of 1919.
- March 11–June 8 – Russian Civil War: The Cossacks of the Upper Don rebel against Bolshevik rule in the Vyoshenskaya Uprising and join the White forces.
- March 15–17 – Members of the American Expeditionary Forces convene in Paris for the first American Legion caucus.
- March 17 – Birth of the Commonwealth of the Philippines.
- March 21 – The Hungarian Soviet Republic is established by Béla Kun.
- March 23 – Benito Mussolini founds his Italian Fascist political movement in Milan.
- March 23–24 – Charles I, the last Emperor of Austria, leaves Austria for exile in Switzerland.
- March 26 – Queen of the South F.C. is formed in Dumfries, Scotland.
- March 27 – The name Bratislava is officially adopted for the city of Pressburg.

=== April ===
- April 5 – Pinsk massacre: 35 Jews are killed by the Polish Army without trial after being accused of Bolshevism.
- April 6–7 – The Bavarian Soviet Republic is founded.
- April 10 – Mexican Revolution leader Emiliano Zapata is ambushed and shot dead in Morelos.
- April 12 – French serial killer Henri Désiré Landru is arrested.
- April 13
  - Amritsar Massacre: Under the command of Reginald Dyer, detachments of the 9th Gorkha Rifles and the 59th Scinde Rifles massacre 379 Sikh civilians at Jallianwala Bagh in Amritsar, in the Punjab Province.
  - Eugene V. Debs enters prison at the Atlanta Federal Penitentiary in Atlanta, Georgia for speaking out against conscription in the United States during World War I.
- April 15
  - The Save the Children Fund is created in the UK to raise money for the relief of German and Austrian children.
  - Jeam-ri massacre: The Imperial Japanese Army murdered more than 20 residents of Jeam-ri as retaliation of the March First Movement protests in the region.
- April 20 – The French Army blows up the bridge over the Dniester at Bender, Moldova, to protect the city from the Bolsheviks.
- April 22–June 20 – Russian Civil War: Counteroffensive of Eastern Front – The Reds go on the offensive on the Siberia Front: General Gaya Gai defeats the White forces near Orenburg after a 3-day battle. Over the next weeks, the Red Army pushes the Whites behind the Ural Mountains.
- April 23 – The Estonian Constituent Assembly convenes its first session.
- April 25
  - The Bauhaus architectural and design movement is founded in Weimar, Germany.
  - Anzac Day is observed for the first time in Australia.
  - Pancho Villa takes Parral, Chihuahua, in Mexico, and executes the mayor and his two sons.
- April 30 – First wave of 1919 United States anarchist bombings: several bombs sent by followers of the Italian anarchist Luigi Galleani are intercepted.

=== May ===
- May 1 – May Day Riots break out in Cleveland, Ohio, United States; 2 people are killed, 40 injured, and 116 arrested.
- May 2 – Weimar Republic troops and the Freikorps occupy Munich and crush the Bavarian Soviet Republic.
- May 3 – Amānullāh Khān launches a surprise attack on the British government in India.
- May 4
  - The May Fourth Movement erupts in China as a result of the decision at the Paris Peace Conference to transfer former German concessions in Jiaozhou Bay to Japan rather than return sovereign authority to China.
  - The League of Red Cross Societies is formed in Paris.
- May 6 – The Third Anglo-Afghan War begins.
- May 8–27 – United States Navy Curtiss flying boat NC-4, commanded by Albert Cushing Read, makes the first transatlantic flight, from Naval Air Station Rockaway to Lisbon via Trepassey, Newfoundland (departs May 16) and the Azores (arrives May 17). (On May 30–31 it flies on to Plymouth in England.)
- May 9 – In Belgium, a new electoral law introduces universal manhood suffrage and gives the franchise to certain classes of women.
- May 14 – The University College of Wales, Aberystwyth, establishes probably the world's first chair in International Politics, endowed by David Davies and his sisters in honour of Woodrow Wilson, with Alfred Eckhard Zimmern as first professor.
- May 15
  - Greek landing at Smyrna: The Hellenic Army lands at Smyrna assisted by ships of the British Royal Navy.
  - A law providing for full women's suffrage in the Netherlands is introduced.
  - Winnipeg general strike: Workers in Winnipeg, Canada, begin a strike for better wages and working conditions; the strike lasts for six weeks.
- May 19
  - Mustafa Kemal Atatürk lands at Samsun on the Anatolian Black Sea coast, marking the start of the Turkish War of Independence. The anniversary of this event is also an official day of Turkish Youth.
  - Volcano Kelud erupts in Java, killing about 5,000.
  - The first issue of The Carolinian is published at the State Normal and Industrial College.
- May 23 – The University of California opens its second campus in Los Angeles. Initially called Southern Branch of the University of California (SBUC), it is eventually renamed the University of California, Los Angeles (UCLA).
- May 25 – Estonian War of Independence: Estonian forces capture Pskov from the Red Army, and soon hand it over to the White forces.
- May 27
  - Fyodor Raskolnikov is exchanged for 14 British prisoners of war.
  - Siege of Spin Boldak (Third Anglo-Afghan War). This is the last time the British Army uses an escalade.
- May 29
  - Eddington experiment: Einstein's theory of general relativity is tested by Arthur Eddington's observation of the "bending of light" during a total solar eclipse in Príncipe, and by Andrew Crommelin in Sobral, Ceará, Brazil (confirmed November 19).
  - The Republic of Prekmurje formally declares independence from Hungary.
- May 30 – By agreement with the United Kingdom, later confirmed by the League of Nations, Belgium is given the mandate over part of German East Africa (Ruanda-Urundi).

=== June ===
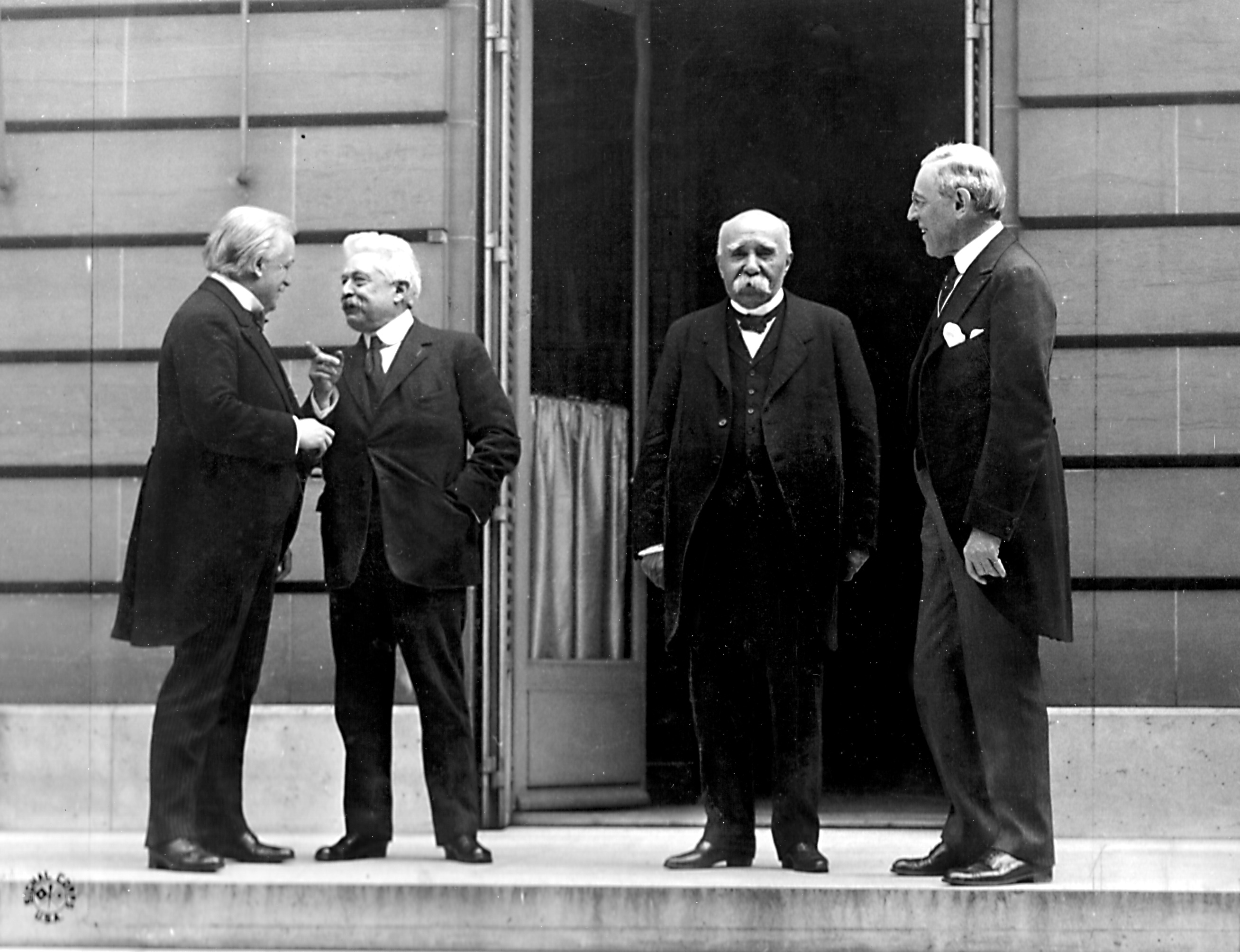
"The Big Four" during the Paris Peace Conference (from left to right, David Lloyd George, Vittorio Orlando, Georges Clemenceau, Woodrow Wilson).

- June – Earl W. Bascom, rodeo cowboy and artist, along with his father John W. Bascom at Lethbridge, Alberta, Canada, designs and makes rodeo's first reverse-opening side-delivery bucking chute, which becomes the world standard.
- June 2 – 1919 United States anarchist bombings: Eight mail bombs are sent to prominent figures.
- June 4 – Women's rights: The United States Congress approves the Nineteenth Amendment to the United States Constitution, which would guarantee suffrage to women, and sends it to the states for ratification.
- June 5 – Estonian and Latvian Wars of Independence: The advancing pro-German Baltische Landeswehr initiates war against Estonia in Northern Latvia.
- June 6 – The Hungarian Red Army attacks the Republic of Prekmurje.
- June 7
  - Sette Giugno on Malta: British troops fire on a mob protesting against the colonial government, killing four.
  - Russian Civil War: Counteroffensive of Eastern Front: The Red army captures the city of Birsk from the White forces.
- June 9 – Russian Civil War: Counteroffensive of Eastern Front: The Red army recaptures the city of Ufa
- June 14–15 – A Vickers Vimy piloted by British aviator John Alcock, with navigator Arthur Whitten Brown, makes the first nonstop transatlantic flight, from St. John's, Newfoundland, to Clifden, Connemara, Ireland.
- June 15 – Pancho Villa attacks Ciudad Juárez, Mexico. When the bullets begin to fly to the American side of the border, two units of the United States 7th Cavalry Regiment cross the border, to push Villa's forces from American territory.
- June 17 – Epsom Riot by Canadian troops: English Police Sergeant Thomas Green is killed.
- June 18 – The second most popular football club in Costa Rica, Liga Deportiva Alajuelense, is founded.
- June 20–25 – Russian Civil War, Southern Front: The White Volunteer Army defeats the exhausted Red forces in the Kharkiv Operation, capturing the industrial city of Kharkiv.
- June 21
  - Bloody Saturday of the Winnipeg general strike: Royal North-West Mounted Police fire a volley of bullets into a crowd of unemployed war veterans, killing two.
  - Scuttling of the German fleet at Scapa Flow: Admiral Ludwig von Reuter scuttles the German fleet interned at Scapa Flow, Scotland; nine German sailors are killed.
- June 23 – Estonian and Latvian Wars of Independence – Battle of Cēsis: The Estonian army defeats the pro-German Baltische Landeswehr in northern Latvia, forcing it to retreat towards Riga; the event is celebrated subsequently as Victory Day in Estonia.
- June 26 – British Foreign Office official St John Philby and T. E. Lawrence arrive in Cairo for discussions about Arab unrest in Egypt, having been flown by Canadian pilot Harry Yates in a Handley Page bomber which set off from England on June 21.
- June 28
  - The Treaty of Versailles is signed, formally ending World War I, five years to the day since the assassination of Archduke Franz Ferdinand. John Maynard Keynes, who has been present at the conference and is unhappy with the terms of the treaty, brings out his own analysis later in the year, entitled The Economic Consequences of the Peace.
  - The International Labour Organization (ILO) is established as an agency of the League of Nations.

=== July ===
- July 1 – Russian Civil War: Perm Operation (1918–19) begins on the Siberian Front: The 2nd and 3rd armies of Soviet Russia recapture the city of Perm.
- July 2 – The Syrian National Congress in Damascus: Arab nationalists announce independence.
- July 2–6 – British airship R34 makes the first transatlantic flight by dirigible, and the first westbound flight, from RAF East Fortune, Scotland, to Mineola, New York.
- July 3
  - Estonian and Latvian Wars of Independence: The pro-German Baltische Landeswehr signs a peace treaty with Estonia and Latvia. The pro-German Prime Minister of Latvia Andrievs Niedra resigns, and Latvian forces take over Riga on July 8.
  - Russian Civil War, Southern Front: General Anton Denikin of the White Volunteer Army proclaims Directive No. 08878 (the Moscow Directive), defining the operational and strategic target of the White Guard armies, to seize Moscow at this time controlled by the Bolsheviks, beginning the Advance on Moscow.
- July 5–20 – Russian Civil War, Eastern or Siberian Front, Ekaterinburg Operation: The Red Army captures the city of Ekaterinburg in the Ural Mountains from the White rule of Admiral Alexander Kolchak.
- July 7 – The United States Army sends a convoy across the continental U.S., starting in Washington, D.C., to assess the possibility of crossing North America by road. This crossing takes many months to complete, because the building of the U.S. Highway System has not commenced.
- July 11 – The eight-hour day and free Sunday become law for workers in the Netherlands.
- July 19 – The Foreign Ministry of the Azerbaijan Democratic Republic is established, by decree of the chancellory for foreign affairs.
- July 21 – Wingfoot Air Express crash: The dirigible Wingfoot Air Express catches fire over downtown Chicago. Two passengers, one aircrewman and ten people on the ground are killed; however, two people parachute to the ground safely.
- July 27 – The Chicago Race Riot of 1919 begins when a white man throws stones at a group of four black teens on a raft.
- July 28 – The International Astronomical Union is founded in Paris, France.
- July 31 – British police strikes in London and Liverpool for recognition of the National Union of Police and Prison Officers; over 2,000 strikers are dismissed.

=== August ===
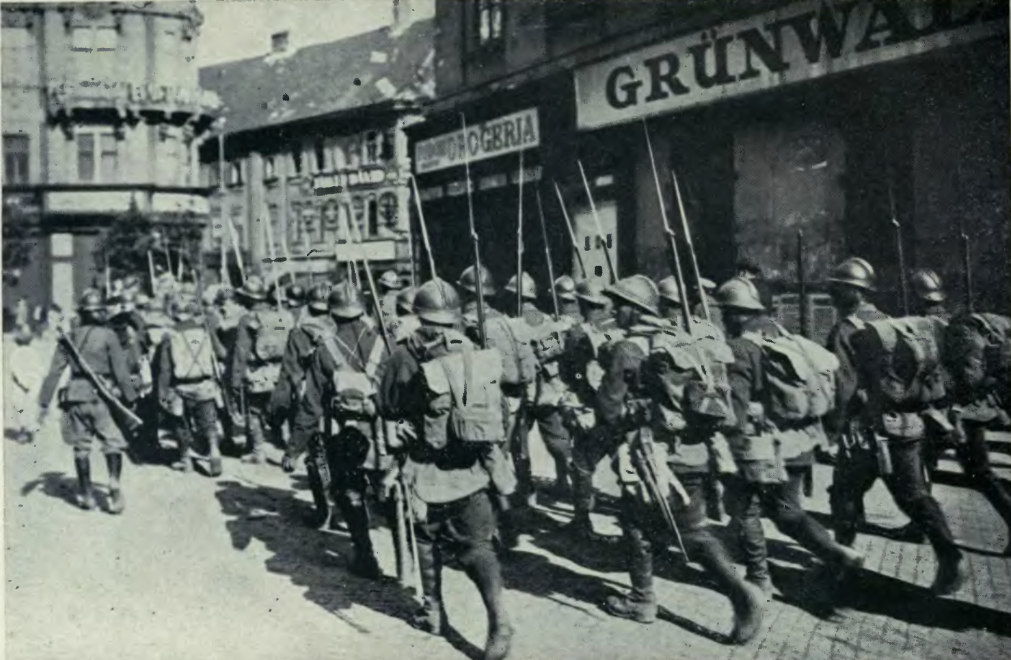
Romanian troops entering Budapest

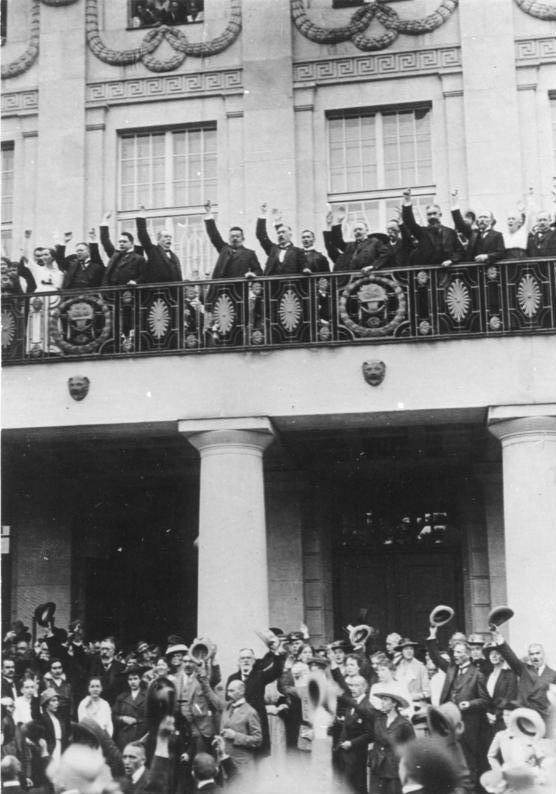
Friedrich Ebert becomes president in Weimar, Germany

- August 1 – Béla Kun's Hungarian Soviet Republic collapses.
- August 3 – The Romanian army enters Timișoara.
- August 4 – The Romanian army occupies Budapest.
- August 8 – The Anglo-Afghan Treaty of 1919, signed in Rawalpindi, ends the Third Anglo-Afghan War, with the United Kingdom recognising the right of the Emirate of Afghanistan to manage its own foreign affairs and Afghanistan recognising the Durand Line as the border with British India.
- August 11 – In Germany, the Weimar Constitution is proclaimed to be in effect (ratified).
- August 14–September 12 – Russian Civil War: Southern Front counteroffensive – The Red Army commanded by Vladimir Yegoryev attacks the White Volunteer Army of General Anton Denikin but is defeated.
- August 16–26 – First Silesian Uprising: Poles in Upper Silesia rise against the Germans.
- August 18 – Russian Civil War: North Russia intervention – The Bolshevik fleet at Kronstadt, protecting Petrograd on the Baltic Sea, is substantially damaged by British Royal Navy Coastal Motor Boats (torpedo boats) and military aircraft in a combined operation.
- August 21 – Friedrich Ebert becomes the first President of Germany (Reichspräsident) under the Weimar Constitution.
- August 27 – South African Prime Minister Louis Botha dies in office of 'Spanish flu'.
- August 29 – Russian Civil War: The Red Army captures Pskov from White forces.
- August 31
  - Russian Civil War, Southern Front: the city of Kyiv is captured by the White Army.
  - The Communist Party of America is established.

=== September ===
- September 1–October 2 – Russian Civil War, Siberian Front: Admiral Alexander Kolchak launches his final offensive in the Tobolsk operation, defeating the Red Army.
- September 3 – Jan Smuts becomes the second prime minister of South Africa.
- September 6 – The U.S. Army expedition across North America, which started July 7, ends in San Francisco.
- September 10–15 – The Florida Keys hurricane kills 600 in the Gulf of Mexico, Florida and Texas.
- September 10 – The Treaty of Saint-Germain is signed, ending World War I with Austria-Hungary and declaring that the latter's empire is to be dissolved. The Republic of German-Austria becomes the First Austrian Republic but retains less than 40% of the prewar imperial territory.
- September 12 – Gabriele D'Annunzio, with his entourage, marches into Fiume and convinces Italian troops to join him.
- September 17 – German South West Africa is placed under South African administration.
- September 18–November 14 – Russian Civil War, Western Front: Battle of Petrograd: The White general Nikolai Yudenich approaches the city of Saint Petersburg with 18,500 soldiers, but is defeated by the defense organized by Leon Trotsky.
- September 21 – The Steel strike of 1919 begins across the United States.
- September 27 – Russian Civil War: The last British Army troops leave Arkhangelsk and leave the fighting to the Russians.
- September 30 – Elaine massacre: An estimated 100 to 800 African Americans are killed in Elaine, Arkansas, by white mobs and vigilante militias assisted by federal troops in "the deadliest racial confrontation in Arkansas history and possibly the bloodiest racial conflict in the history of the United States".

=== October ===
- October 2 – President of the United States Woodrow Wilson suffers a serious stroke, rendering him an invalid for the remainder of his life.
- October 7 – The Dutch airline KLM is founded (as of 2025, it is the world's oldest airline still flying under its original name).
- October 9 – In Major League Baseball, the Cincinnati Reds win the World Series, five games to three, over the Chicago White Sox, whose players are later found to have lost intentionally.
- October 10 – Estonia adopts a radical land reform, nationalizing 97% of agrarian lands, mostly still belonging to the Baltic German nobility.
- October 13 – The Convention relating to the Regulation of Aerial Navigation is signed, in Paris, France.
- October 16 – In Germany, Adolf Hitler gives his first speech for the German Workers' Party (DAP).
- October 26 – 1919 Luxembourg general election, the first in the duchy with female suffrage, following constitutional amendments of May 15.
- October 28 – Prohibition in the United States: The United States Congress passes the Volstead Act, over President Woodrow Wilson's veto. Prohibition goes into effect on January 17, 1920, under the provisions of the Eighteenth Amendment to the United States Constitution.
- October 29–November 29 – First Annual Meeting of the International Labour Conference.

=== November ===
- November 1 – The Coal Strike of 1919 begins in the United States, by the United Mine Workers under John L. Lewis; a final agreement is reached on December 10.
- November 7
  - The first of the Palmer Raids is conducted on the second anniversary of the Russian Revolution: over 10,000 suspected communists and anarchists are arrested in 23 different U.S. cities by the end of January 1920.
  - Inspired by Cape Town's daily Noon Gun Three Minute Pause, King George V institutes the Two Minute Silence, following a suggestion by Sir Percy Fitzpatrick, to be observed annually at the Eleventh Hour of the Eleventh Day of the Eleventh Month.
- November 9 – Felix the Cat debuts in Feline Follies.
- November 10–12 – The first national convention of the American Legion is held in Minneapolis.
- November 10 – Abrams v. United States: The Supreme Court of the United States upholds the conviction of Abrams for inciting resistance to the war effort against Soviet Russia.
- November 11
  - Russian Civil War: The Northwestern Army of General Nikolai Yudenich retreats to Estonia and is disarmed.
  - The Centralia Massacre in Centralia, Washington (United States), originating at an Armistice Day parade, results in the deaths of four members of the American Legion and the lynching of a local leader of the Industrial Workers of the World (IWW).
  - The first Remembrance Day is observed in the British Empire with a two-minute silence at 11:00 hours.
- November 14 – Russian Civil War, Siberian Front: Admiral Alexander Kolchak's White forces begin the Great Siberian Ice March from the cities of Omsk and Tomsk to Irkutsk, escaping from the victorious Red Army.
- November 16 – After Entente pressure, Romanian forces withdraw from Budapest and allow Admiral Horthy to march in.
- November 19 – The Treaty of Versailles fails a critical ratification vote in the United States Senate. It will never be ratified by the U.S.
- November 27 – The Treaty of Neuilly-sur-Seine is signed between the Allies and Bulgaria.

=== December ===
- December 1
  - American-born Nancy Astor, Viscountess Astor, becomes the first woman to take her seat in the House of Commons of the United Kingdom, having become the second to be elected on November 28.
- December 4 – The French Opera House in New Orleans, Louisiana is destroyed by fire.
- December 18–31 – Russian Civil War, Southern Front: The Red army captures the Donbas region from the Volunteer Army.
- December 21 – The United States deports 249 people, including Emma Goldman, to Russia on the USAT Buford.
- December 23 – Sex Disqualification (Removal) Act 1919 becomes law in the United Kingdom, removing legal disabilities on women entering the secular professions.
- December 25 – Cliftonhill Stadium in Coatbridge, Scotland, opens as the home of Albion Rovers F.C. They lose the opening match 2–0 to St Mirren.
- December 26 – American baseball player Babe Ruth is traded by the Boston Red Sox to the New York Yankees for $125,000, the largest sum ever paid for a player at this time, a deal made public at the beginning of January 1920.

=== Date unknown ===
- Severe inflation in Germany sees the Papiermark rise to 47 marks against the United States dollar by December, compared to 12 marks in April.

== Births ==
=== January ===
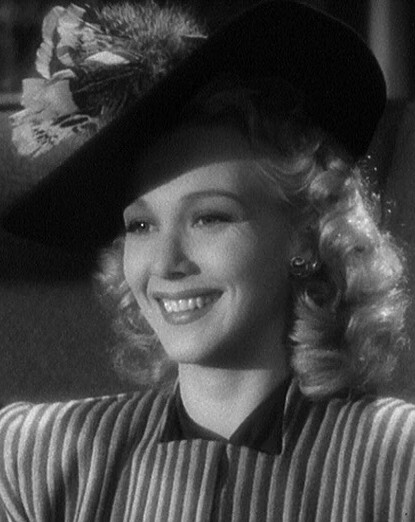
Carole Landis

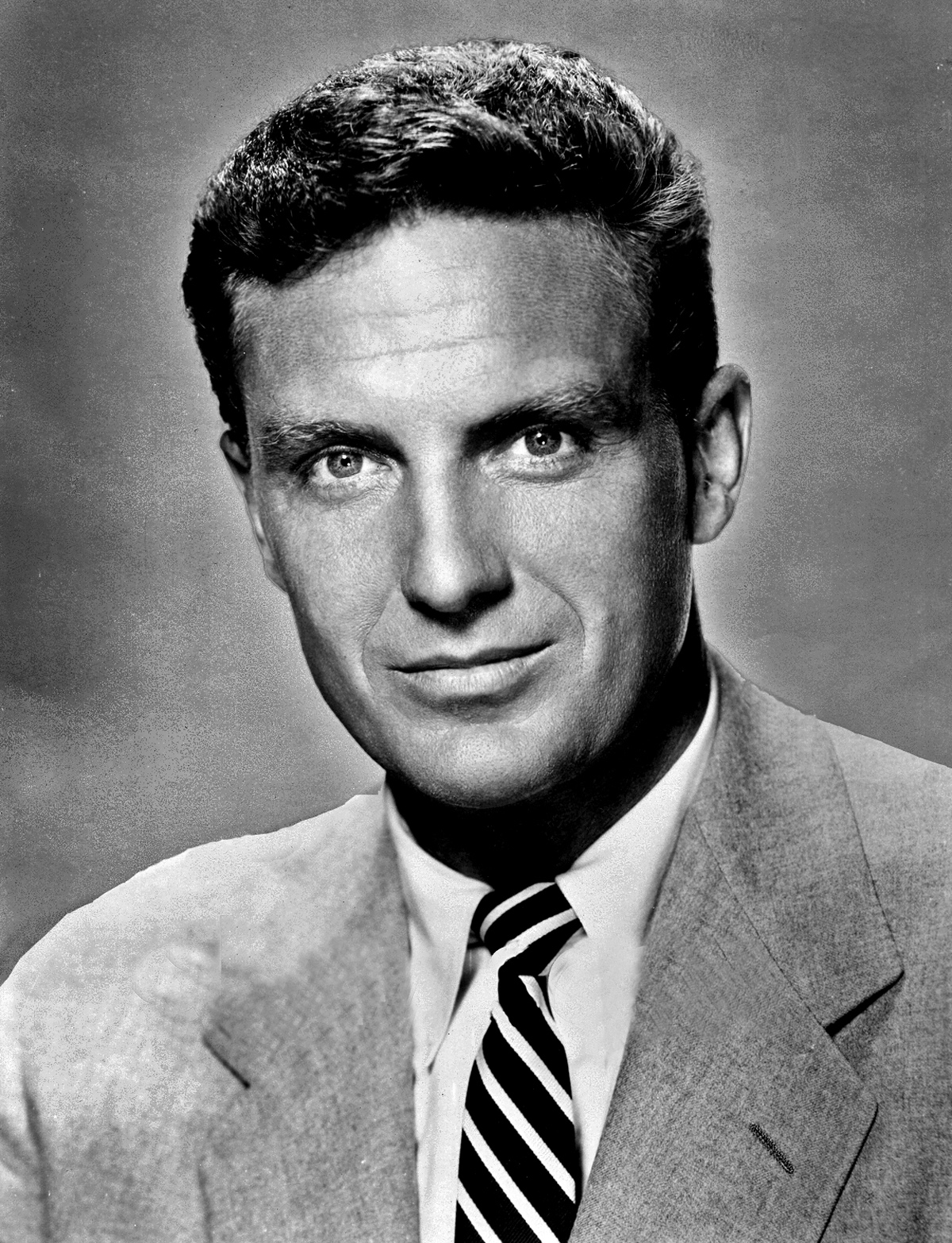
Robert Stack

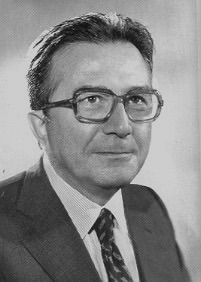
Giulio Andreotti

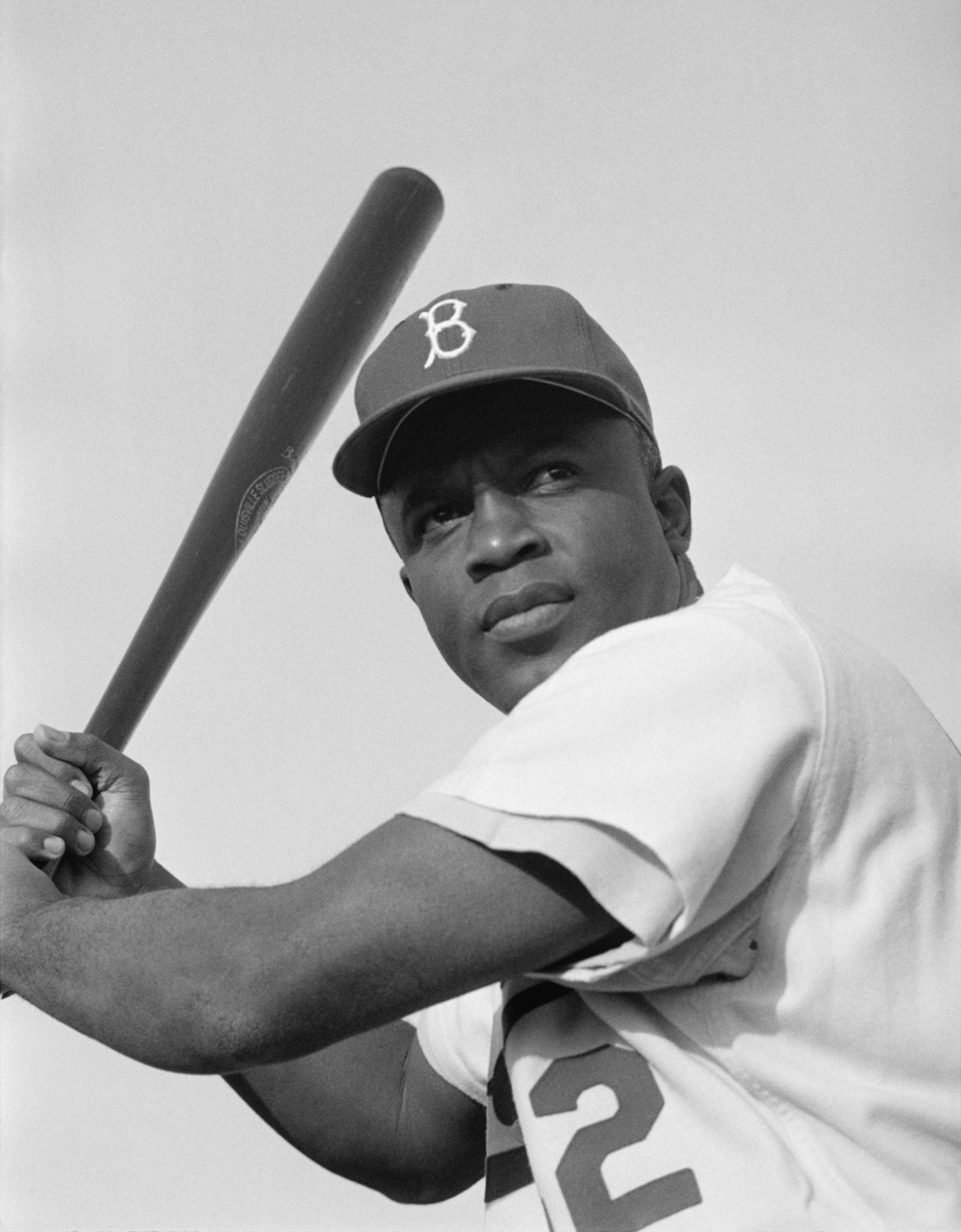
Jackie Robinson

- January 1
  - Sirr Al-Khatim Al-Khalifa, 5th Prime Minister of Sudan (d. 2006)
  - Daniil Granin, Soviet-Russian author (d. 2017)
  - Rocky Graziano, American boxer (d. 1990)
  - Carole Landis, American actress (d. 1948)
  - J. D. Salinger, American novelist (d. 2010)
  - Sheila Mercier, British actress (d. 2019)
  - Frances Bay, American actress (d. 2011)
- January 13 – Robert Stack, American actor (d. 2003)
- January 14
  - Giulio Andreotti, Italian politician, 3-time Prime Minister of Italy (d. 2013)
  - Andy Rooney, American television personality (d. 2011)
- January 15 – George Cadle Price, 2-time Prime Minister of Belize (d. 2011)
- January 17 – Mingote, Spanish cartoonist (d. 2012)
- January 19 – Antonio Pietrangeli, Italian film director and screenwriter (d. 1968)
- January 23
  - Hans Hass, Austrian zoologist and undersea explorer (d. 2013)
  - Ernie Kovacs, American comedian (d. 1962)
  - Bob Paisley, English footballer and manager (d. 1996)
- January 25 – Norman Newell, English record producer and lyricist (d. 2004)
- January 26 – Valentino Mazzola, Italian footballer (d. 1949)
- January 27 – Ross Bagdasarian Sr., American musician and actor (Alvin and the Chipmunks) (d. 1972)
- January 31 – Jackie Robinson, African-American baseball player (d. 1972)

=== February ===
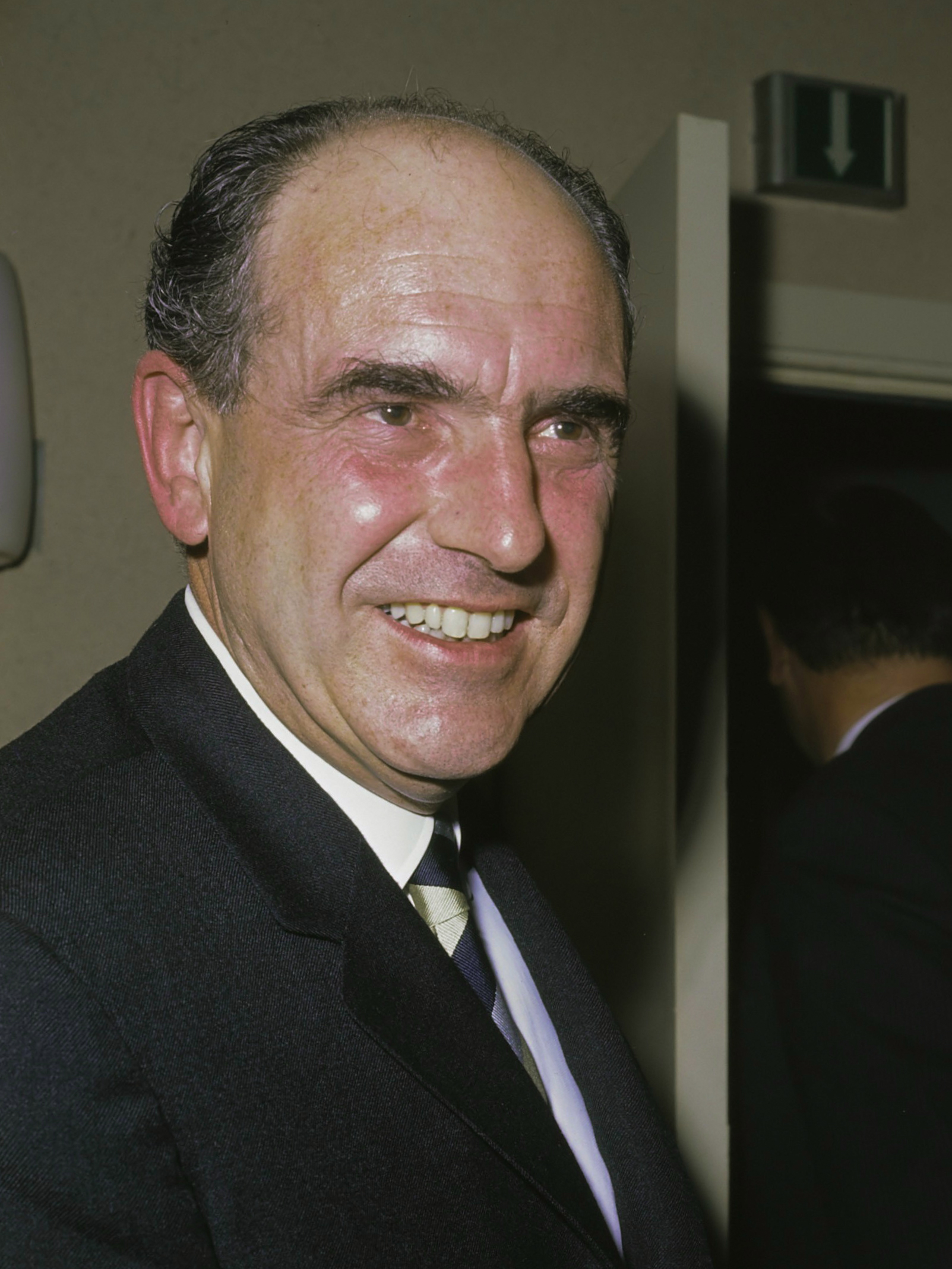
Andreas Papandreou

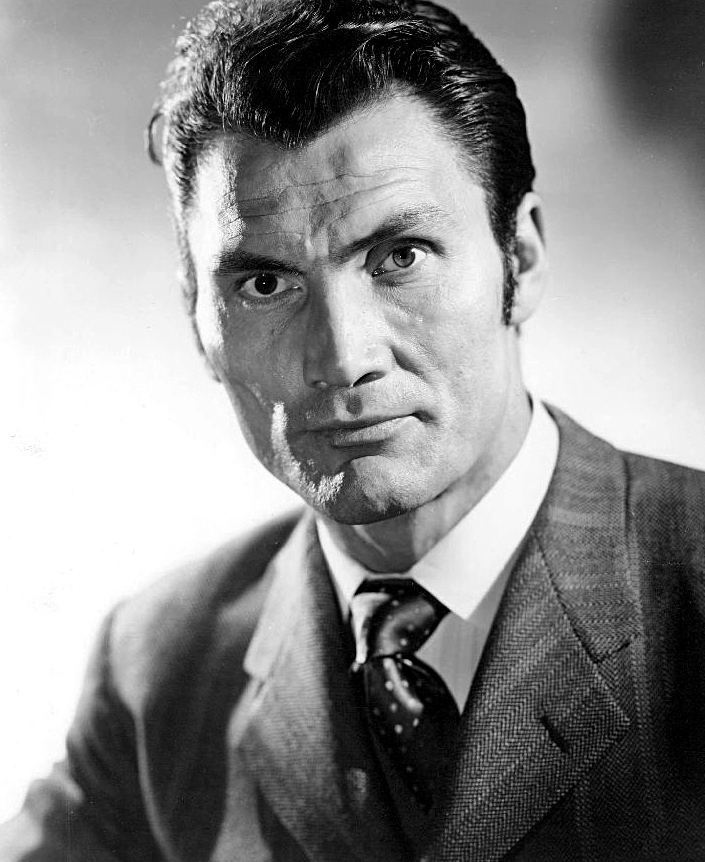
Jack Palance

- February 2 – Carlo D'Angelo, Italian actor and voice actor (d. 1973)
- February 4 – Janet Waldo, American actress (d. 2016)
- February 5
  - Red Buttons, American actor (d. 2006)
  - Andreas Papandreou, Prime Minister of Greece (1981–89 and 1993–96) (d. 1996)
- February 11 – Eva Gabor, Hungarian actress (d. 1995)
- February 12
  - Forrest Tucker, American actor (d. 1986)
  - Ferruccio Valcareggi, Italian football player and manager (d. 2005)
- February 13 – Tennessee Ernie Ford, American musician (d. 1991)
- February 17 – Kathleen Freeman, American film, television, voice and stage actress (d. 2001)
- February 18 – Jack Palance, American actor (d. 2006)
- February 20 – Lotfollah Safi Golpaygani, Iranian Marja (d. 2022)
- February 26
  - Rie Mastenbroek, Dutch swimmer (d. 2003)
  - Hyun Soong-jong, 22nd Prime Minister of South Korea (d. 2020)

=== March ===
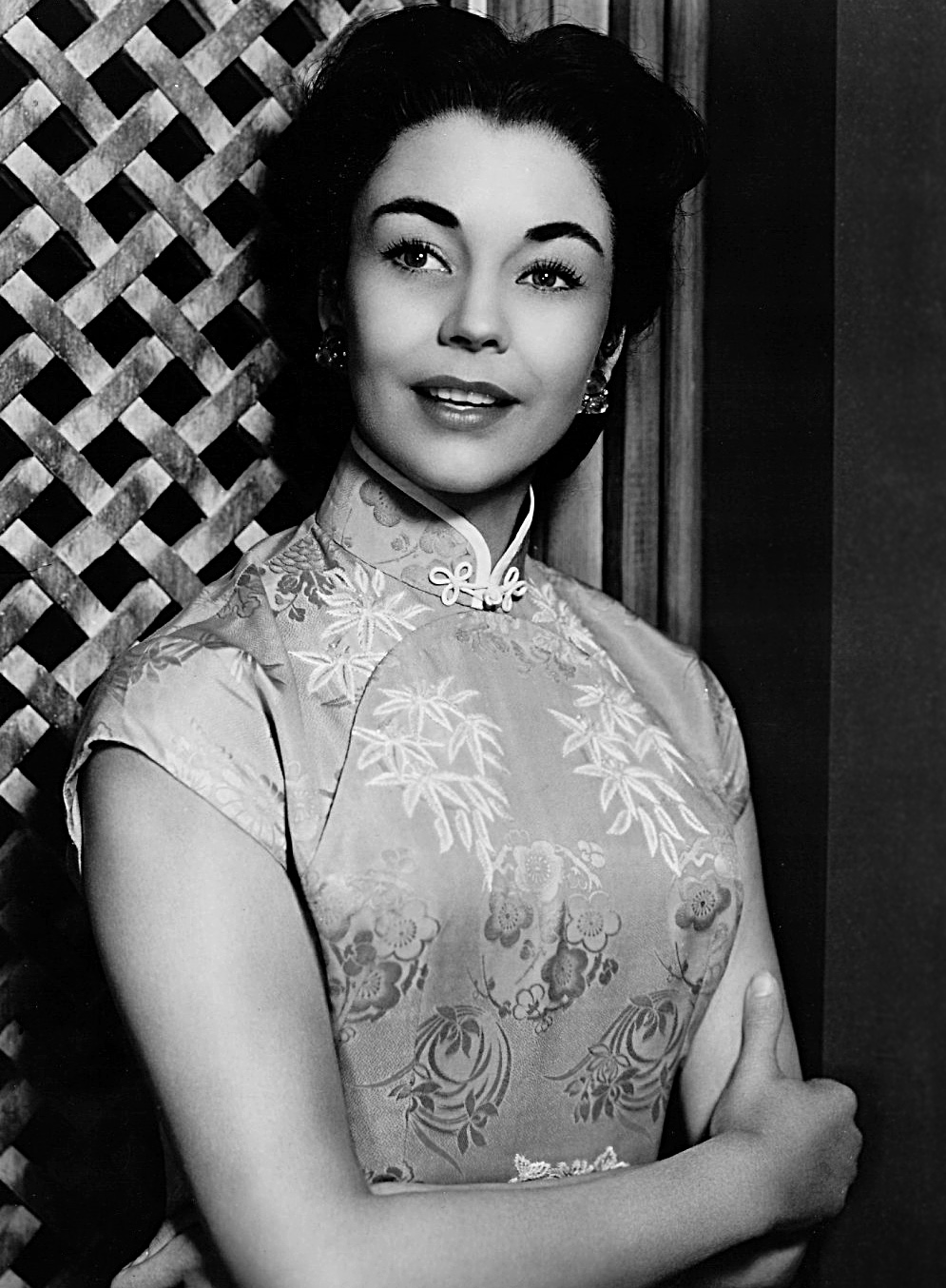
Jennifer Jones

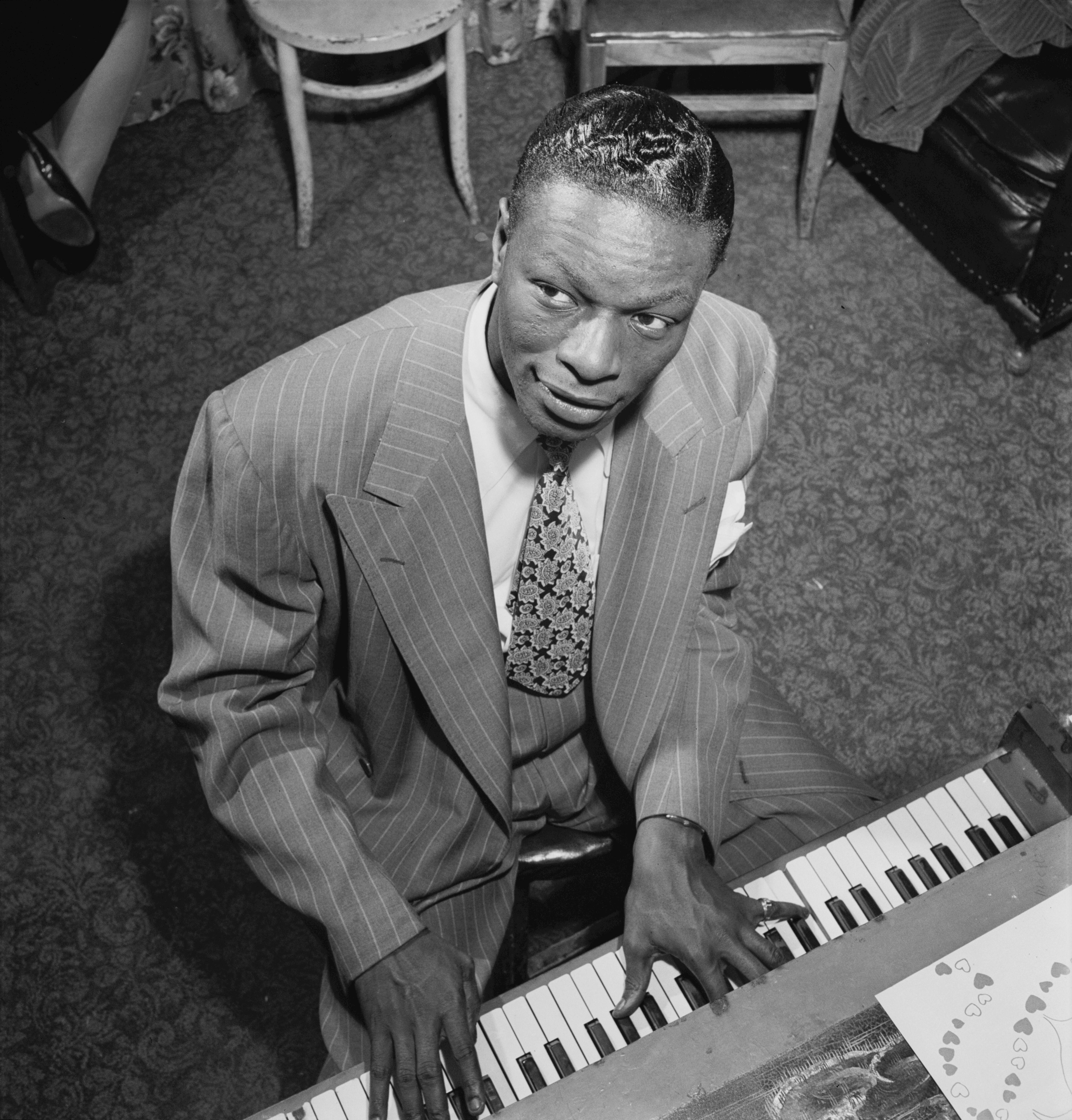
Nat King Cole

- March 2 – Jennifer Jones, American film actress (d. 2009)
- March 3
  - Peter Abrahams, South African-born Jamaican novelist and journalist (d. 2017)
  - Tadahito Mochinaga, Japanese stop-motion animator (d. 1999)
- March 5 – Peter Florjančič, Slovenian inventor (d. 2020)
- March 7 – M. N. Nambiar, Indian film actor (d. 2008)
- March 8 – Santiago Álvarez, Cuban filmmaker (d. 1998)
- March 11 – Kira Golovko, Russian actress (d. 2017)
- March 15
  - George Avakian, Armenian-American record producer and music executive (d. 2017)
  - Lawrence Tierney, American actor (d. 2002)
- March 17
  - Nat King Cole, African American singer (d. 1965)
  - Mad Mike Hoare, Indian-born British mercenary of Irish parentage (d. 2020)
- March 19 – Abdullah Tariki, Saudi politician and government official (d. 1997)
- March 20 – Gerhard Barkhorn, German World War II fighter ace (d. 1983)
- March 24 – Lawrence Ferlinghetti, American poet and publisher (d. 2021)
- March 26 – Frances North, American politician (d. 2003)

=== April ===
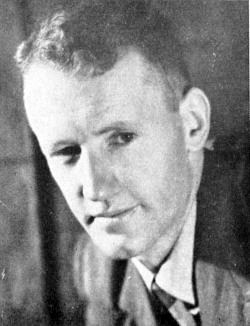
Ian Smith

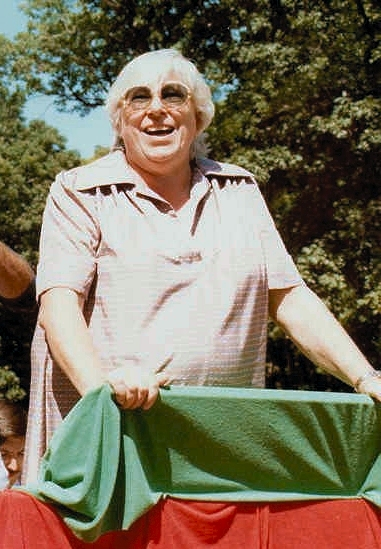
Madalyn Murray O'Hair

- April 1
  - Joseph Murray, American surgeon, recipient of the Nobel Prize in Physiology or Medicine (d. 2012)
  - Jeannie Rousseau, French Allied intelligence agent (d. 2017)
- April 5 – Lester James Peries, Sri Lankan director, screenwriter and producer (d. 2018)
- April 8 – Ian Smith, Prime Minister of Rhodesia (1967–79) (d. 2007)
- April 13 – Howard Keel, American singer and actor (d. 2004)
- April 18 – Esther Afua Ocloo, Ghanaian entrepreneur, pioneer of microlending (d. 2002)
- April 19 – Gloria Marín, Mexican actress (d. 1983)
- April 21
  - André Bettencourt, French politician (d. 2007)
  - Licio Gelli, Italian financer (d. 2015)
- April 22
  - Donald J. Cram, American chemist, Nobel Prize laureate (d. 2001)
  - Edith Tiempo, Filipino poet and National Artist for Literature (d. 2011)
- April 24
  - Glafcos Clerides, Cypriot president (1993–2003) (d. 2013)
  - César Manrique, Spanish artist, sculptor, architect and activist (d. 1992)

=== May ===
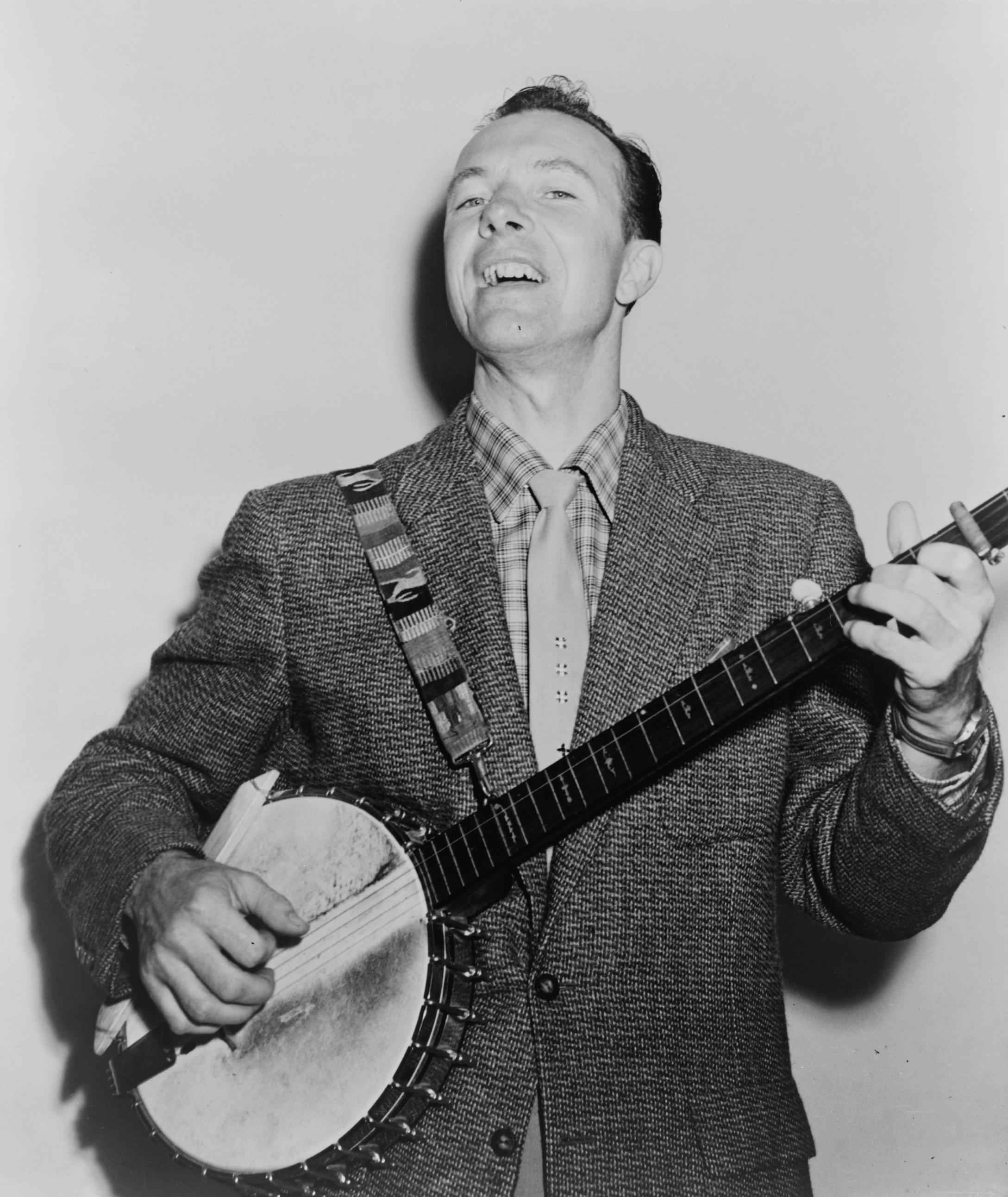
Pete Seeger

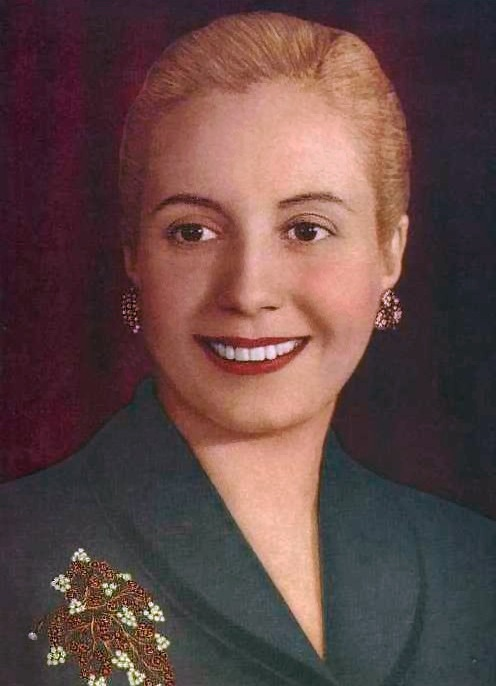
Eva Perón

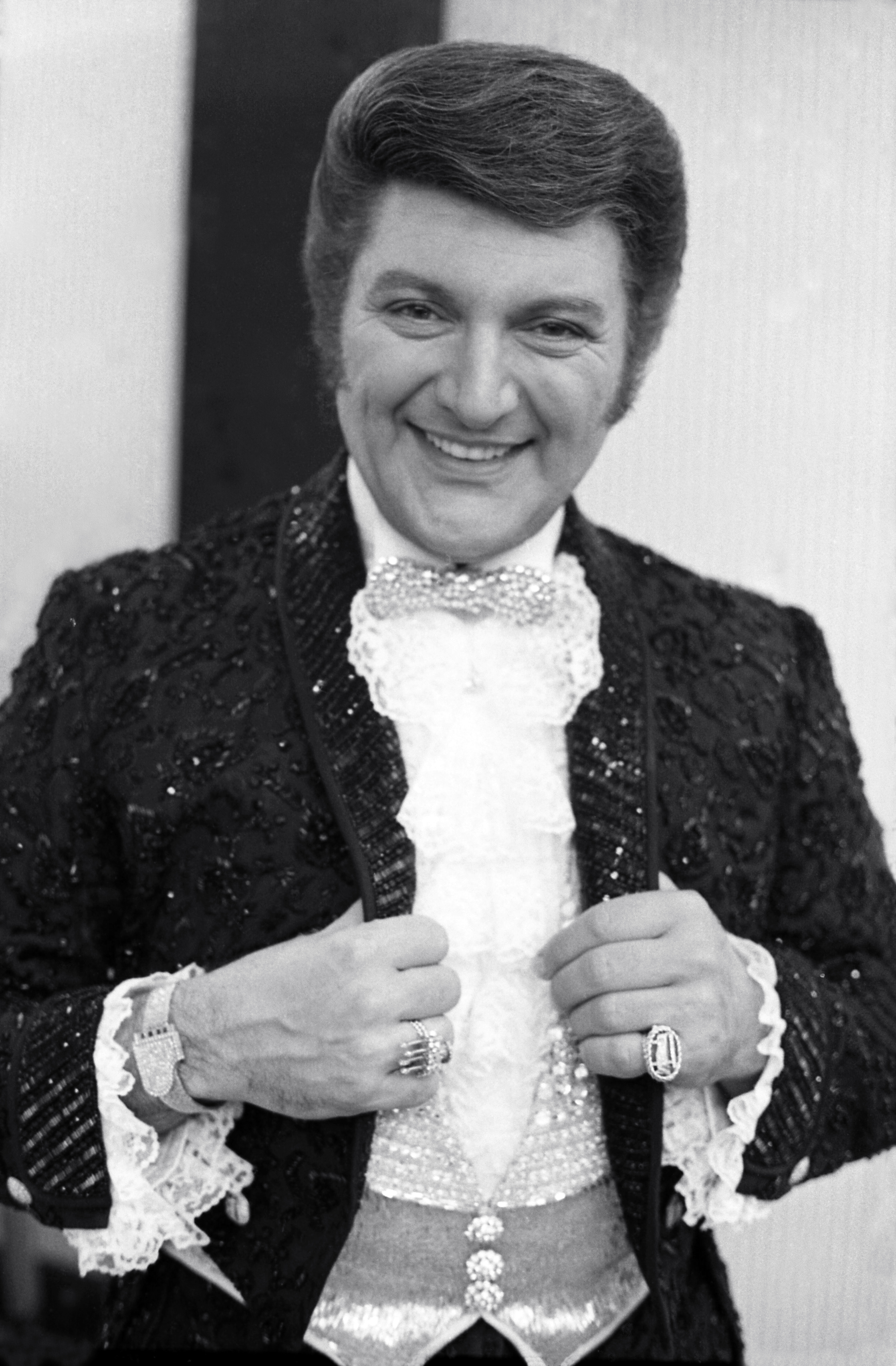
Liberace

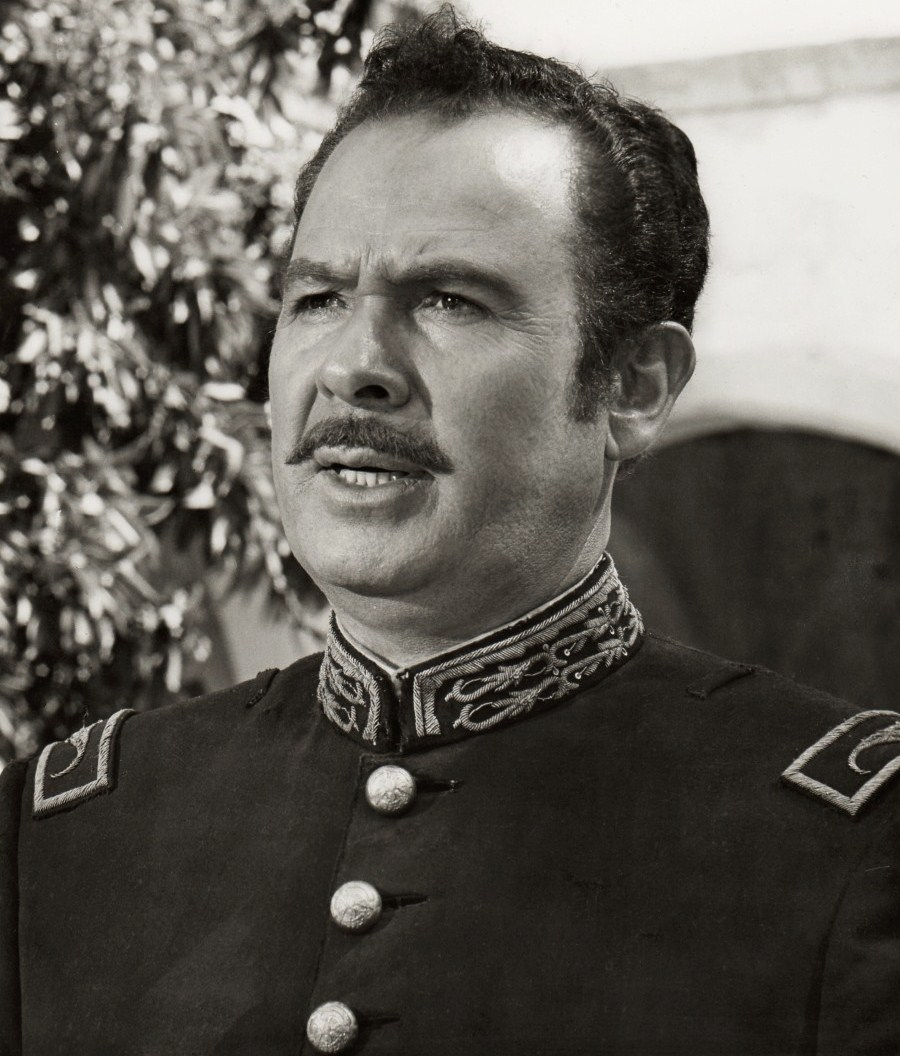
Antonio Aguilar

- May 1
  - Manna Dey, Indian playback singer (d. 2013)
  - Mohammed Karim Lamrani, Prime Minister of Morocco (d. 2018)
  - Dan O'Herlihy, Irish film actor (d. 2005)
- May 3 – Pete Seeger, American folk singer and musician (d. 2014)
- May 5 – Georgios Papadopoulos, President of Greece and Prime Minister of Greece (d. 1999)
- May 7 – Eva Perón, wife of Argentine President Juan Perón (d. 1952)
- May 8 – Lex Barker, American actor (d. 1973)
- May 11 – Pablo de Madalengoitia, Peruvian television host (d. 1999)
- May 15 – Eugenia Charles, 3rd Prime Minister of Dominica (d. 2005)
- May 16 – Liberace, American pianist, singer and actor (d. 1987)
- May 17
  - Antonio Aguilar, Mexican singer and actor (d. 2007)
  - José María Querejeta, Spanish footballer (d. 1989)
- May 18 – Margot Fonteyn, English ballet dancer (d. 1991)
- May 19 – Mitja Ribičič, Slovene politician, 25th Prime Minister of Yugoslavia (d. 2013)
- May 21
  - Vera Altayskaya, Soviet actress (d. 1978)
  - Atmasthananda, Indian Hindu leader (d. 2017)
- May 22 – Paul Vanden Boeynants, 2-time Prime Minister of Belgium (d. 2001)
- May 23 – Betty Garrett, American actress and dancer (d. 2011)
- May 25 – Raymond Smullyan, American mathematician, logician and philosopher (d. 2017)
- May 30 – René Barrientos, 47th President of Bolivia (d. 1969)

=== June ===
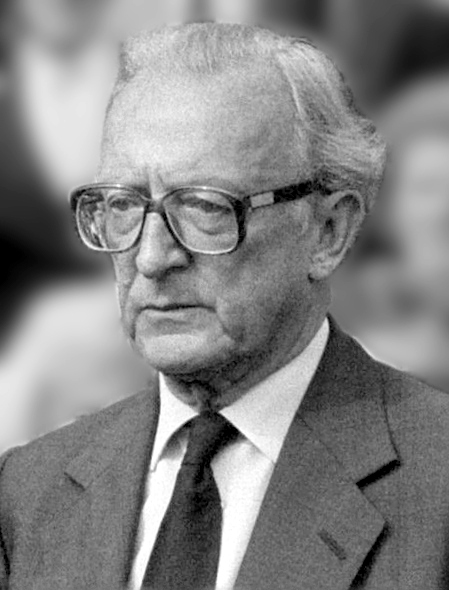
Peter Carington

- June 5 – Veikko Huhtanen, Finnish artistic gymnast (d. 1976)
- June 8 – Abdirashid Ali Shermarke, 2nd President and 3rd Prime Minister of Somalia (d. 1969)
- June 12 – Ahmed Abdallah, President of the Comoros (d. 1989)
- June 16 – V. T. Sambanthan, Malaysian politician (d. 1979)
- June 19 – Pál Fábry, Hungarian politician (d. 2018)
- June 21 – Tsilla Chelton, French actress (d. 2012)
- June 23
  - Mohamed Boudiaf, 4th President of Algeria (d. 1992)
  - Hermann Gmeiner, Austrian educator (d. 1986)
- June 27 – Amala Shankar, Indian dancer (d. 2020)
- June 29 – Slim Pickens, American film and television actor (d. 1983)

=== July ===
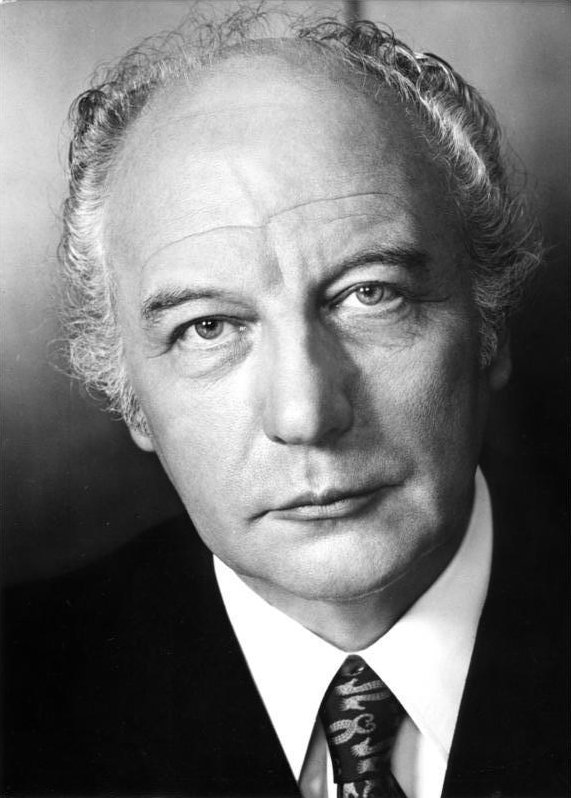
Walter Scheel

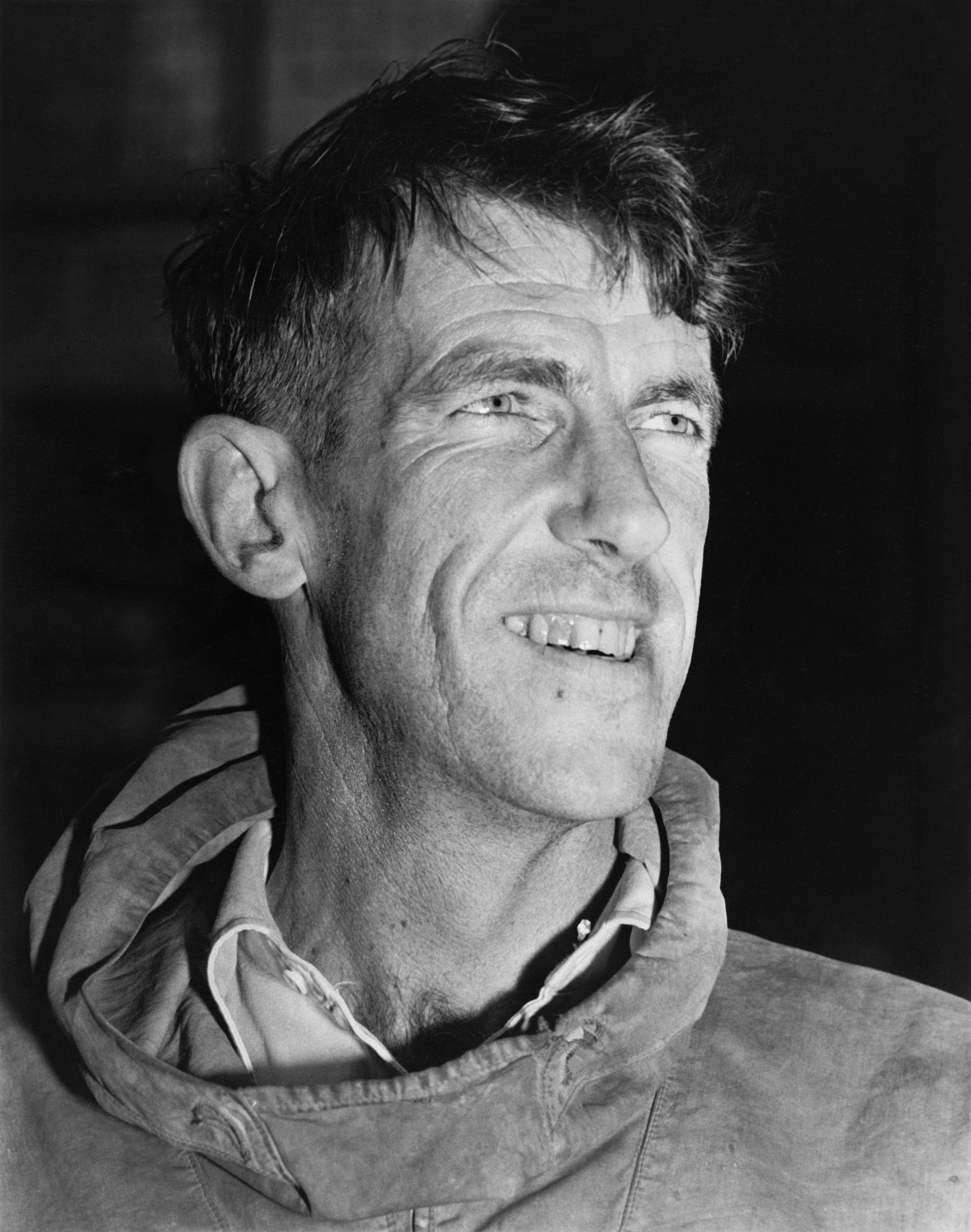
Edmund Hillary

- July 1
  - Mikhail Shultz, Soviet and Russian physical chemist (d. 2006)
  - Arnold Meri, Estonian colonel (d. 2009)
- July 3 – Gabriel Valdés, Chilean politician, lawyer and diplomat (d. 2011)
- July 4 – Gerd Hagman, Swedish actress (d. 2011)
- July 8 – Walter Scheel, President of Germany (d. 2016)
- July 10 – Pierre Gamarra, French poet, novelist and literary critic (d. 2009)
- July 13 – Grisha Filipov, leading member of the Bulgarian communist party (d. 1994)
- July 14
  - Lino Ventura, Italian actor (d. 1987)
  - K. R. Gouri Amma, Indian politician (d. 2021)
- July 15 – Iris Murdoch, British novelist and philosopher (d. 1999)
- July 16
  - Choi Kyu-hah, 19th Prime Minister of South Korea and 4th President of South Korea (d. 2006)
  - Hermine Braunsteiner, Austrian SS officer (d. 1999)
- July 18 – Lilia Dale, Italian actress (d. 1991)
- July 19 – Patricia Medina, English-born actress (d. 2012)
- July 20 – Sir Edmund Hillary, New Zealand mountaineer, conqueror of Mount Everest (d. 2008)
- July 24
  - Asadollah Alam, Iranian politician, 40th Prime Minister of Iran (d. 1978)
  - Ferdinand Kübler, Swiss racing cyclist (d. 2016)
- July 26 – James Lovelock, English biologist and chemist (d. 2022)
- July 31 – Primo Levi, Italian chemist and writer (d. 1987)

=== August ===
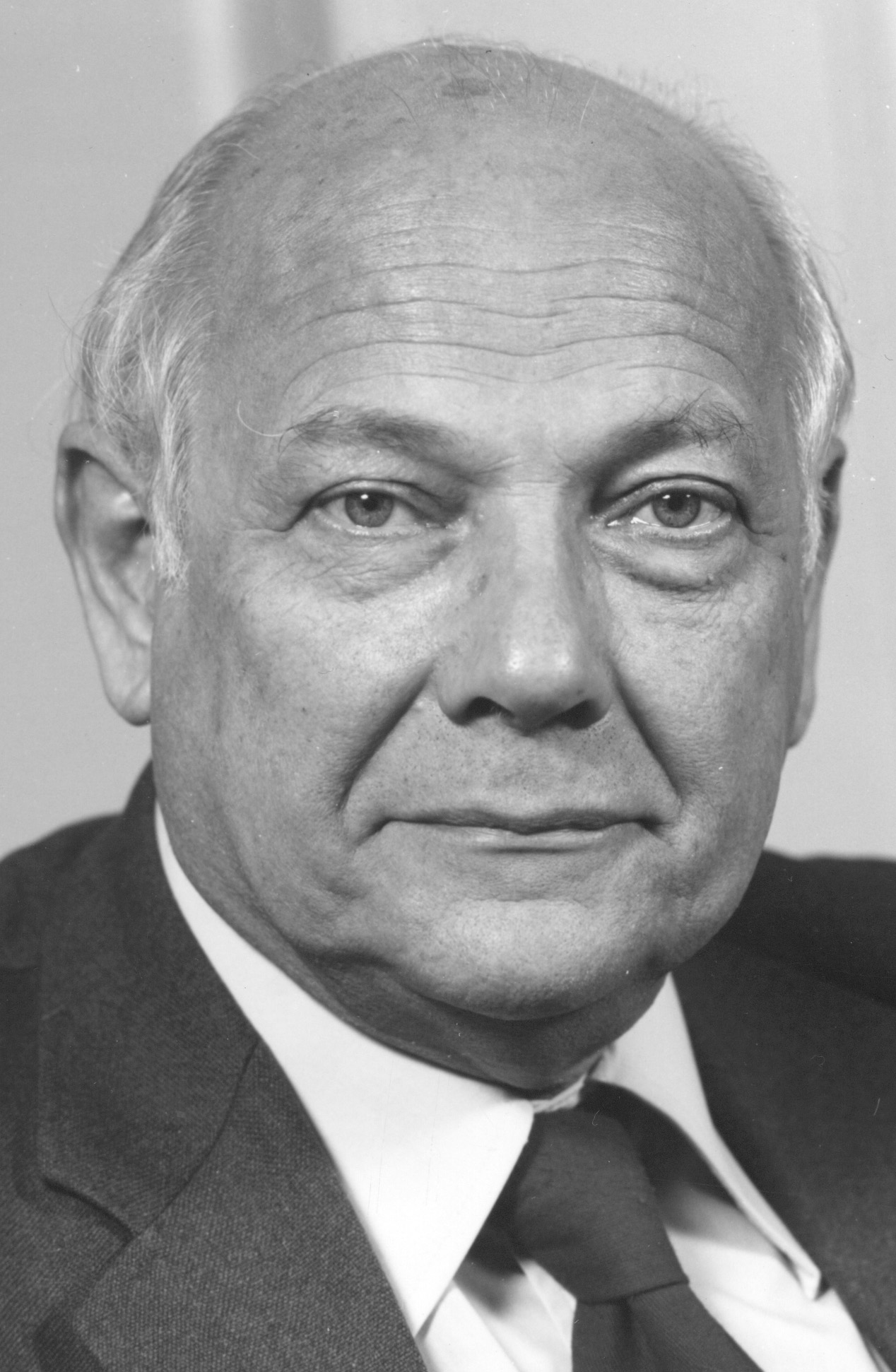
Joop den Uyl

- August 2 – Nehemiah Persoff, Israeli-American character actor (d. 2022)
- August 4 – Michel Déon, French writer (d. 2016)
- August 8
  - Dino De Laurentiis, Italian film producer (d. 2010)
  - Hau Pei-tsun, Premier of the Republic of China (d. 2020)
- August 9 – Joop den Uyl, Dutch politician, Prime Minister of the Netherlands from 1973 to 1977 (d. 1987)
- August 11 – Ginette Neveu, French violinist (d. 1949)
- August 12 – Margaret Burbidge, English-American astrophysicist and academic (d. 2020)
- August 13 – George Shearing, Anglo-American jazz pianist (d. 2011)
- August 15 – Dina Wadia, Indian political figure (d. 2017)
- August 20 – Adamantios Androutsopoulos, Prime Minister of Greece (d. 2000)
- August 24 – Carlos Julio Arosemena Monroy, 31st President of Ecuador (d. 2004)
- August 25 – George Wallace, American politician, 45th Governor of Alabama (d. 1998)
- August 28 – Godfrey Hounsfield, English electrical engineer and inventor, recipient of the Nobel Prize in Physiology or Medicine (d. 2004)
- August 30
  - Maurice Hilleman, American microbiologist and vaccinologist (d. 2005)
  - Joachim Rønneberg, Norwegian war veteran (d. 2018)
  - Wolfgang Wagner, German opera director (d. 2010)
  - Kitty Wells, American country music singer (d. 2012)
- August 31 – Amrita Pritam, Indian poet and author (d. 2005)

=== September ===
- September 2 – Marge Champion, American actress (d. 2020)
- September 8
  - Maria Lassnig, Austrian painter (d. 2014)
  - Meda Mládková, Czech art collector (d. 2022)
- September 11 – Ota Šik, Czech economist and politician (d. 2004)
- September 13
  - Olle Anderberg, Swedish wrestler (d. 2003)
  - Mary Midgley, English philosopher (d. 2018)
- September 15 – Fausto Coppi, Italian cyclist (d. 1960)
- September 18 – Pál Losonczi, Hungarian politician (d. 2005)
- September 21
  - Mario Bunge, Argentine philosopher and physicist (d. 2020)
  - Fazlur Rahman Malik, Pakistani Islamic scholar (d. 1988)
- September 26 – Matilde Camus, Spanish poet and researcher (d. 2012)
- September 27 – James H. Wilkinson, English mathematician (d. 1986)
- September 29 – Margot Hielscher, German singer and film actress (d. 2017)

=== October ===
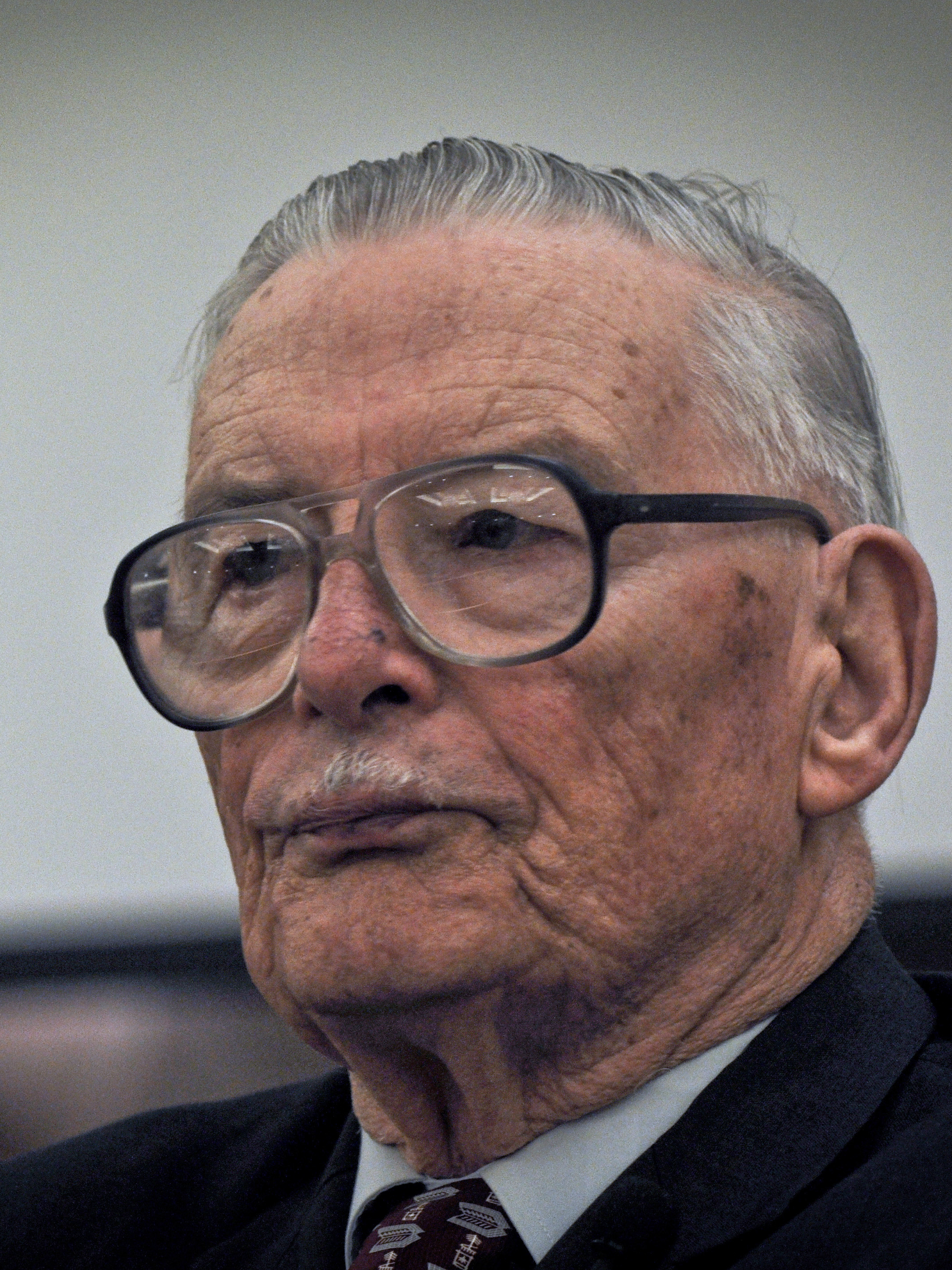
James M. Buchanan

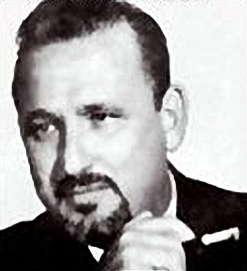
Ezz El-Dine Zulficar

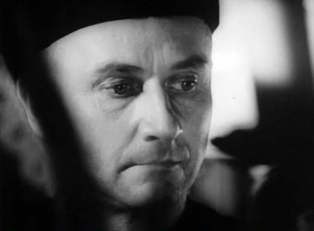
Donald Pleasence

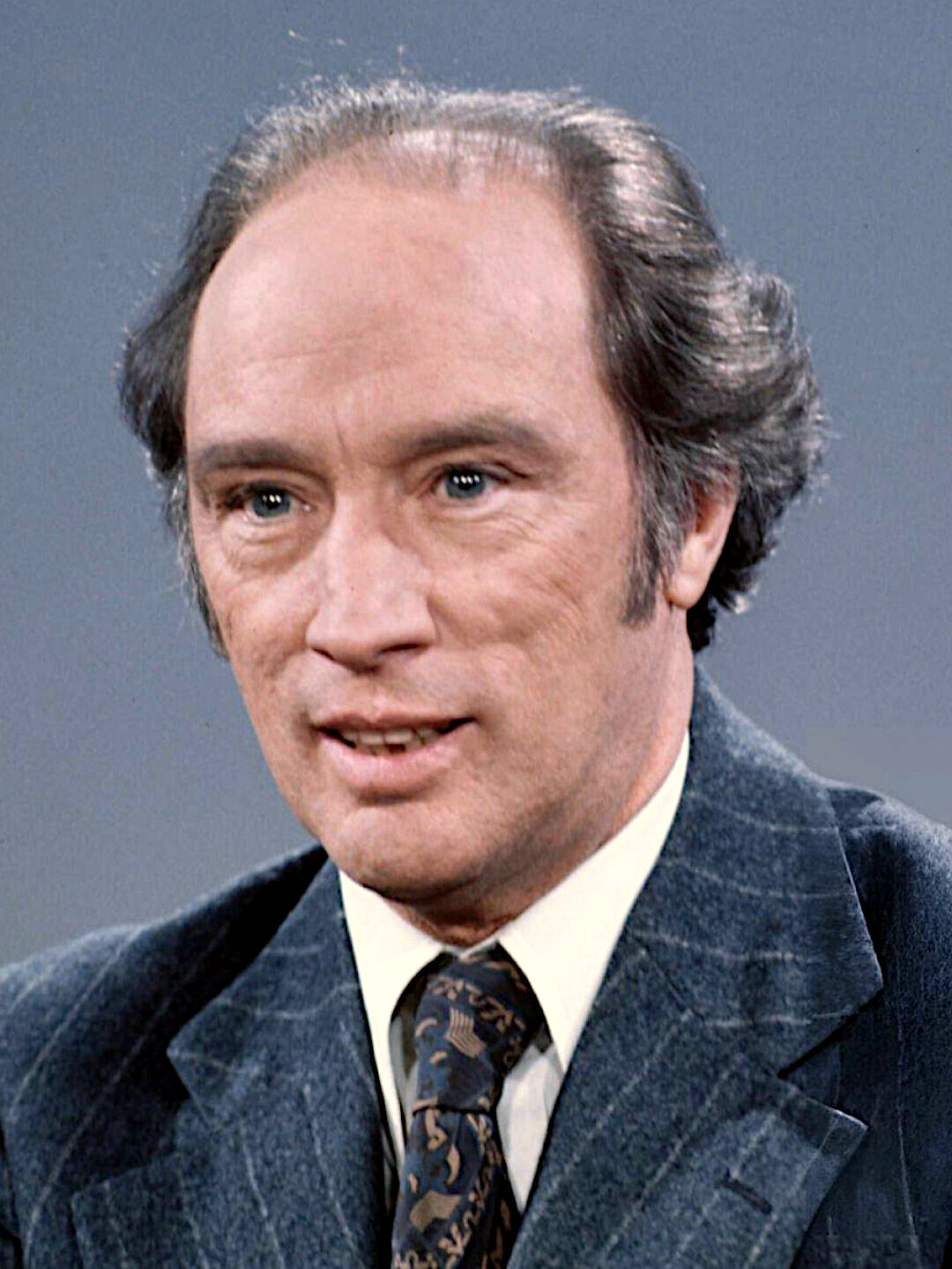
Pierre Trudeau

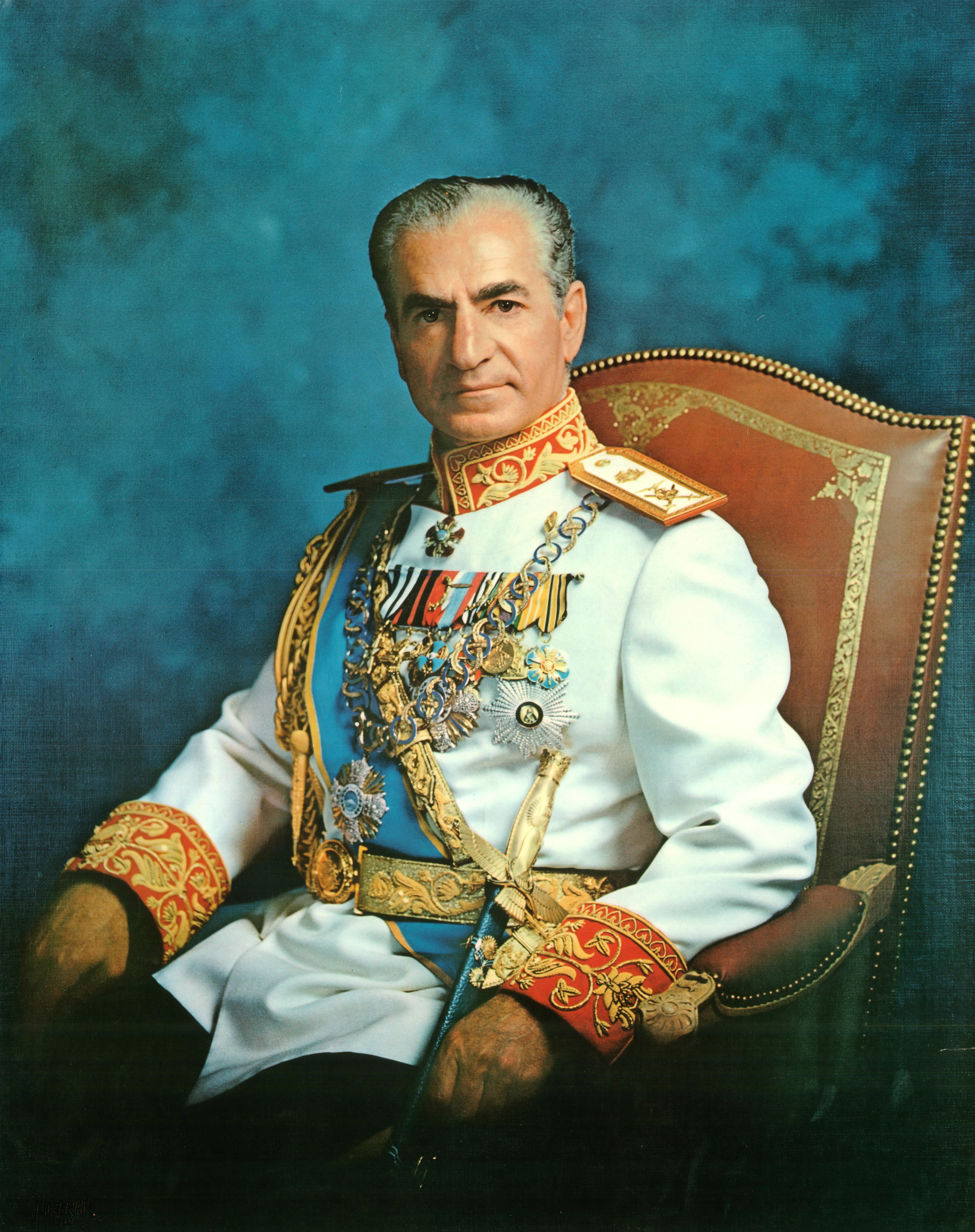
Shah Mohammad Reza Pahlavi

- October 3 – James M. Buchanan, American economist, Nobel Prize laureate (d. 2013)
- October 5 –
  - Donald Pleasence, English actor (d. 1995)
  - Boris Shcherbina, Soviet politician, known for his role in the aftermath of the Chernobyl disaster (d. 1990)
- October 7 – Zelman Cowen, Governor-General of Australia (d. 2011)
- October 8 – Kiichi Miyazawa, 49th Prime Minister of Japan (d. 2007)
- October 11 – Art Blakey, American jazz drummer (d. 1990)
- October 14 – Edward L. Feightner, United States Navy officer (d. 2020)
- October 16 – Kathleen Winsor, American writer (d. 2003)
- October 17
  - Isaak Khalatnikov, Ukrainian-Russian physicist and academic (d. 2021)
  - Zhao Ziyang, Premier of the People's Republic of China (d. 2005)
- October 18
  - Anita O'Day, American jazz singer (d. 2006)
  - Pierre Trudeau, 15th Prime Minister of Canada (d. 2000)
- October 22
  - Abdulrahim Abby Farah, Somali diplomat and politician (d. 2018)
  - Doris Lessing, Persian-born English writer, winner of Nobel Prize in Literature (d. 2013)
- October 23 – Manolis Andronikos, Greek archaeologist (d. 1992)
- October 26
  - Princess Ashraf of Iran (d. 2016)
  - Mohammad Reza Pahlavi, Shah of Iran (d. 1980)
- October 28 – Ezz El-Dine Zulficar, Egyptian filmmaker (d. 1963)
- October 30 – Stane Kavčič, Prime Minister of Slovenia (d. 1987)

=== November ===
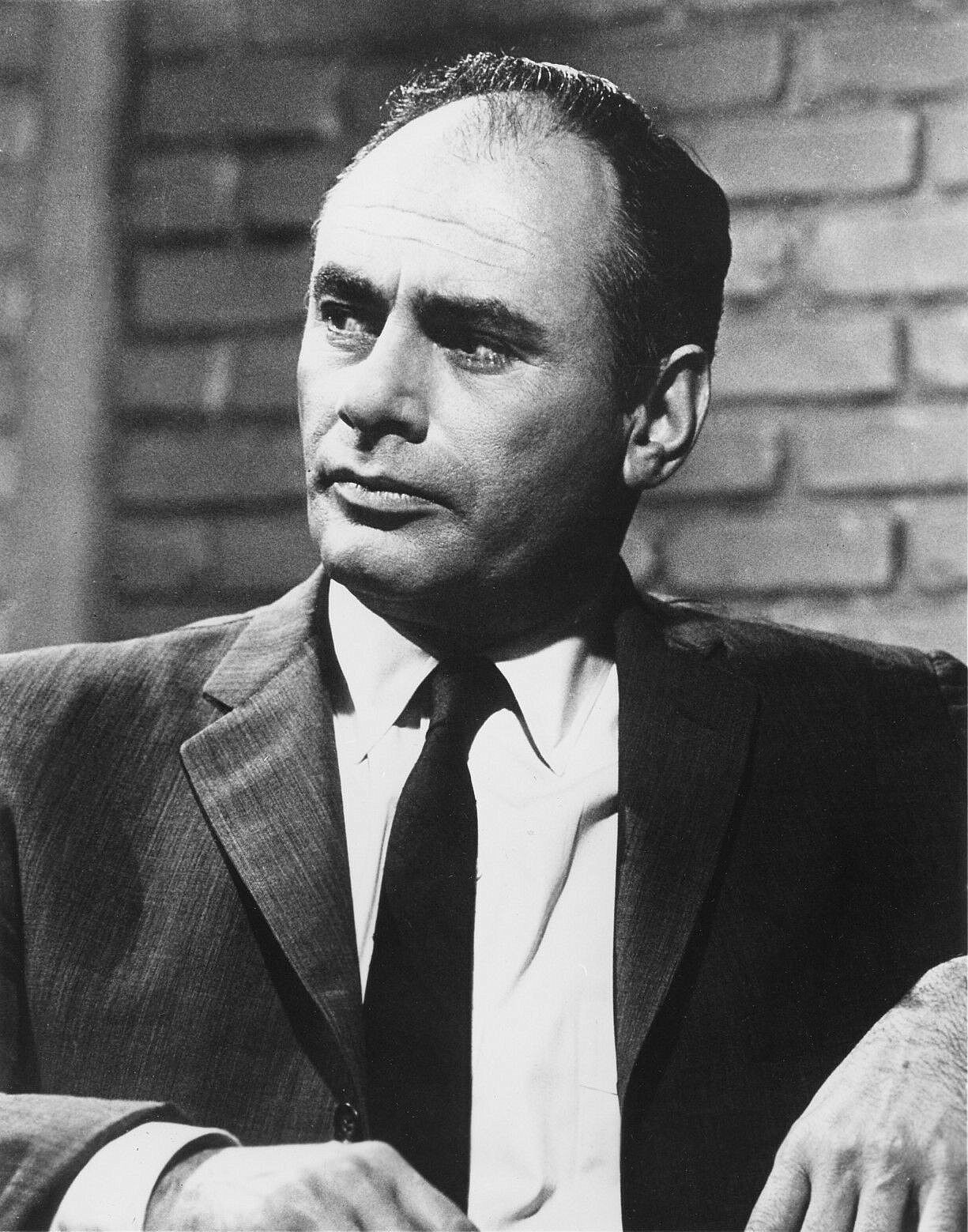
Martin Balsam

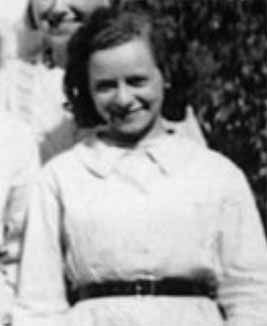
Paulette Libermann

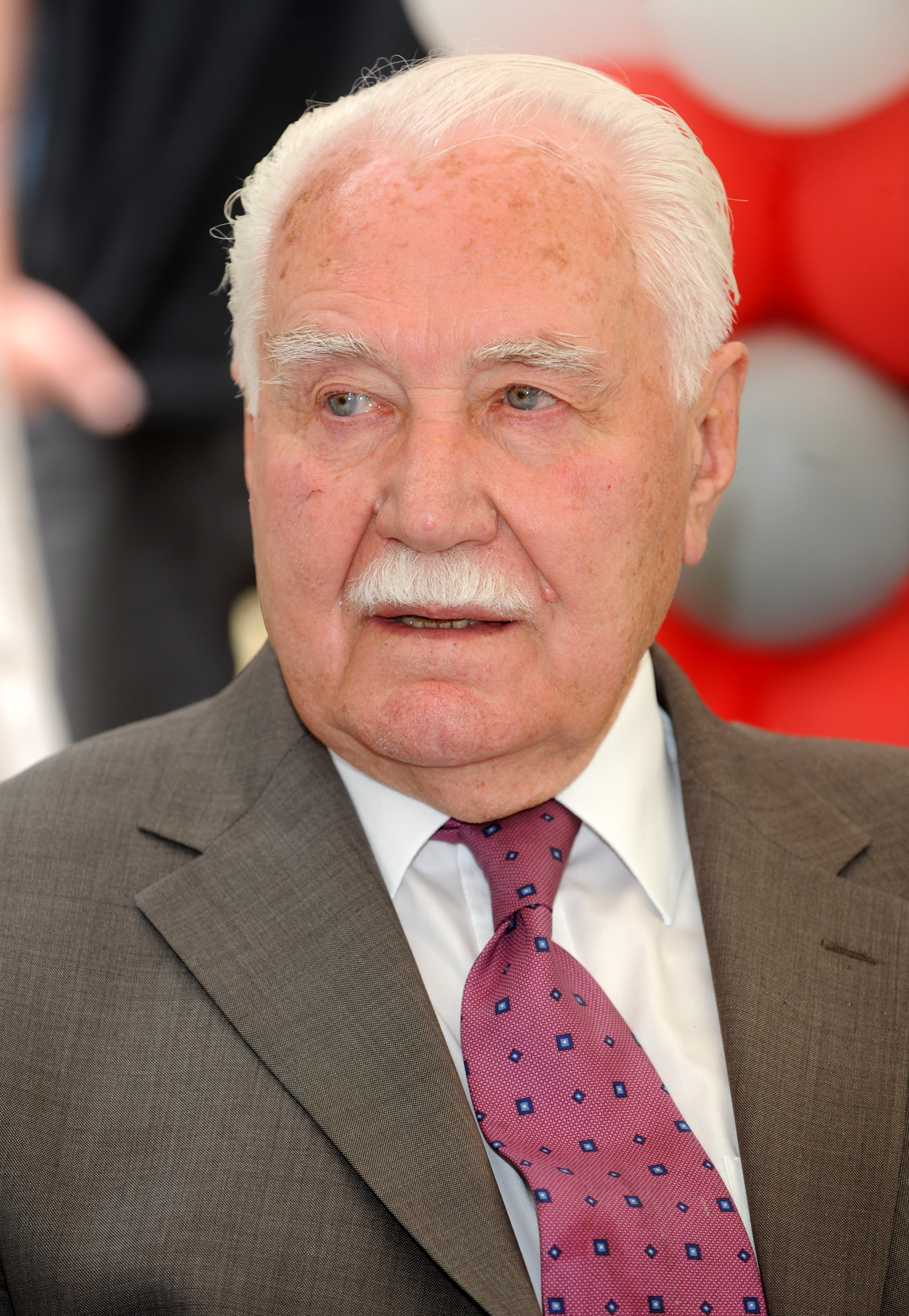
Ryszard Kaczorowski

- November 1
  - Hermann Bondi, British-Austrian mathematician and cosmologist (d. 2005)
  - Russell Bannock, Canadian fighter ace (d. 2020)
- November 4 – Martin Balsam, American actor (d. 1996)
- November 6 – Sophia de Mello Breyner Andresen, Portuguese poet and writer (d. 2004)
- November 9 – Eva Todor, Hungarian-born Brazilian actress (d. 2017)
- November 10
  - Mikhail Kalashnikov, Russian firearms inventor (d. 2013)
  - Moïse Tshombe, Congolese businessman and politician (d. 1969)
- November 14 – Paulette Libermann, French mathematician (d. 2007)
- November 18
  - Andrée Borrel, French World War II heroine (d. 1944)
  - Jocelyn Brando, American actress and writer (d. 2005)
- November 19 – Lolita Lebrón, Puerto Rican nationalist (d. 2010)
- November 21 – Gert Fredriksson, Swedish canoer (d. 2006)
- November 26
  - Ryszard Kaczorowski, President of Poland (d. 2010)
  - Frederik Pohl, American science fiction writer (d. 2013)
- November 28 – Keith Miller, Australian sportsman and Air force pilot (d. 2004)

=== December ===
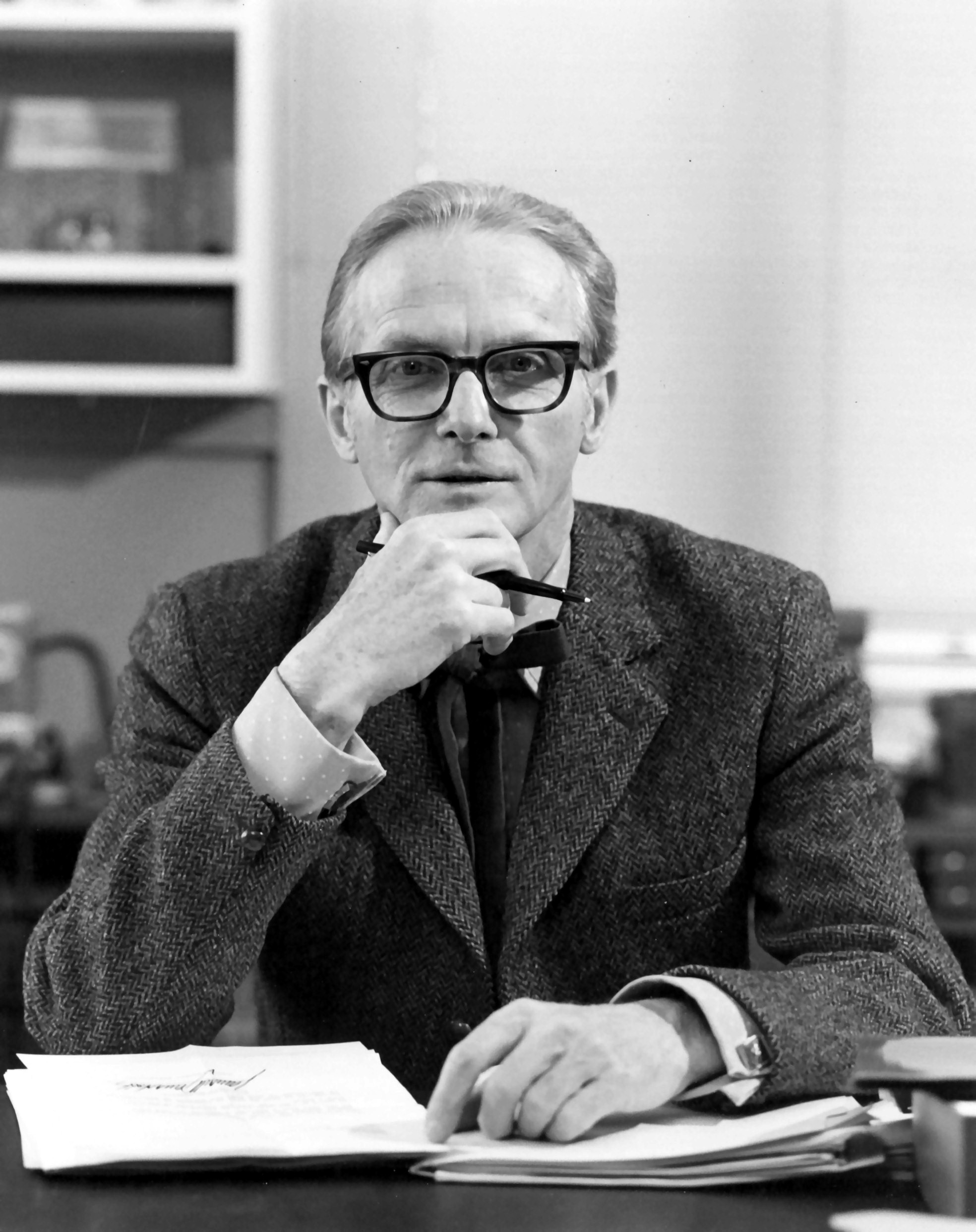
William Lipscomb

- December 4 – I. K. Gujral, Indian politician, Prime Minister of India (d. 2012)
- December 6 – Paul de Man, Belgian-born literary critic (d. 1983)
- December 8 – Mieczysław Weinberg, Polish composer (d. 1996)
- December 9 – William Lipscomb, American chemist, Nobel Prize laureate (d. 2011)
- December 11 – Paavo Aaltonen, Finnish gymnast (d. 1962)
- December 13 – Hans-Joachim Marseille, German World War II fighter ace (d. 1942)
- December 17 – Tomáš Špidlík, Czech cardinal (d. 2010)
- December 24 – Pierre Soulages, French artist (d. 2022)

== Deaths ==
=== January ===
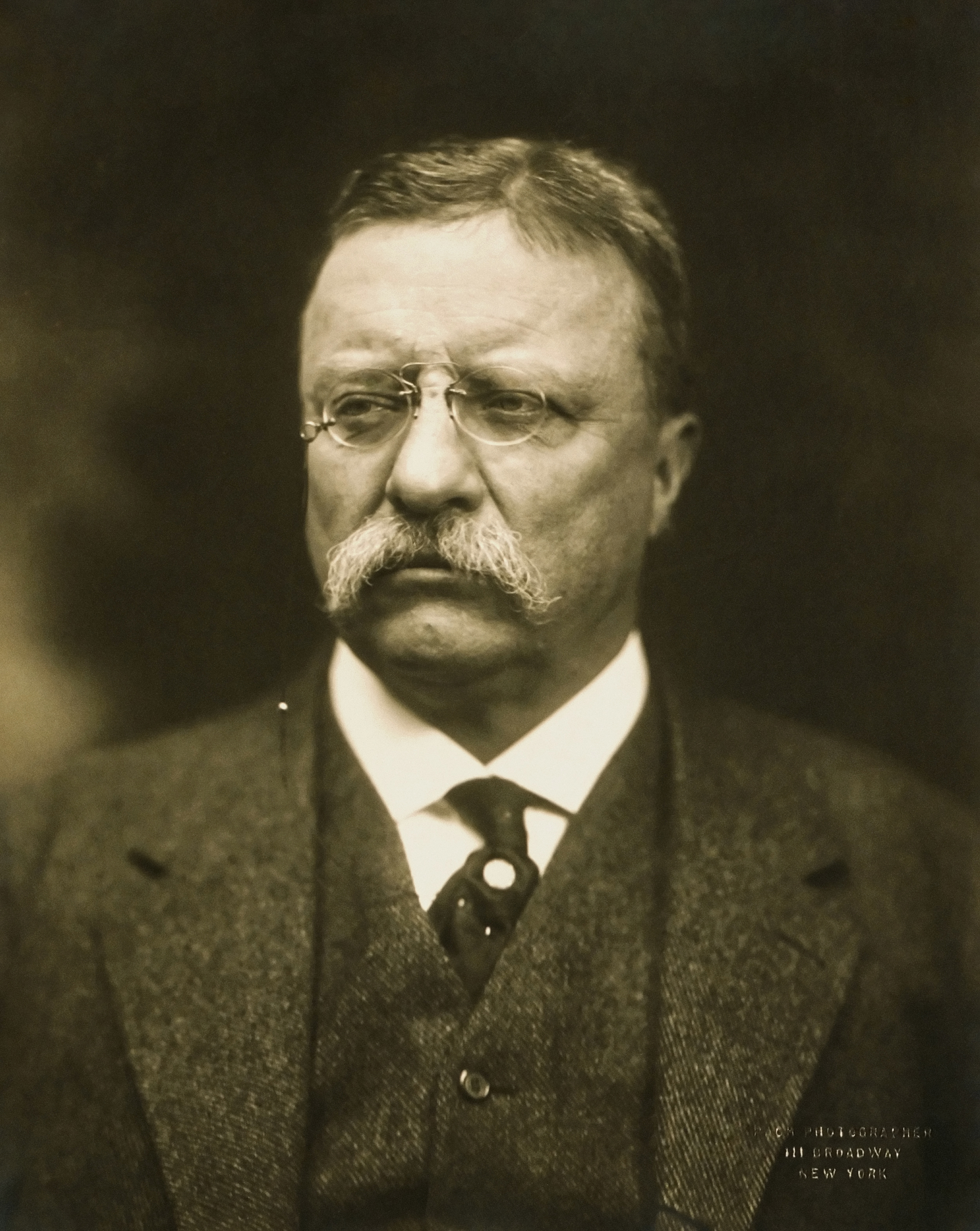
Theodore Roosevelt

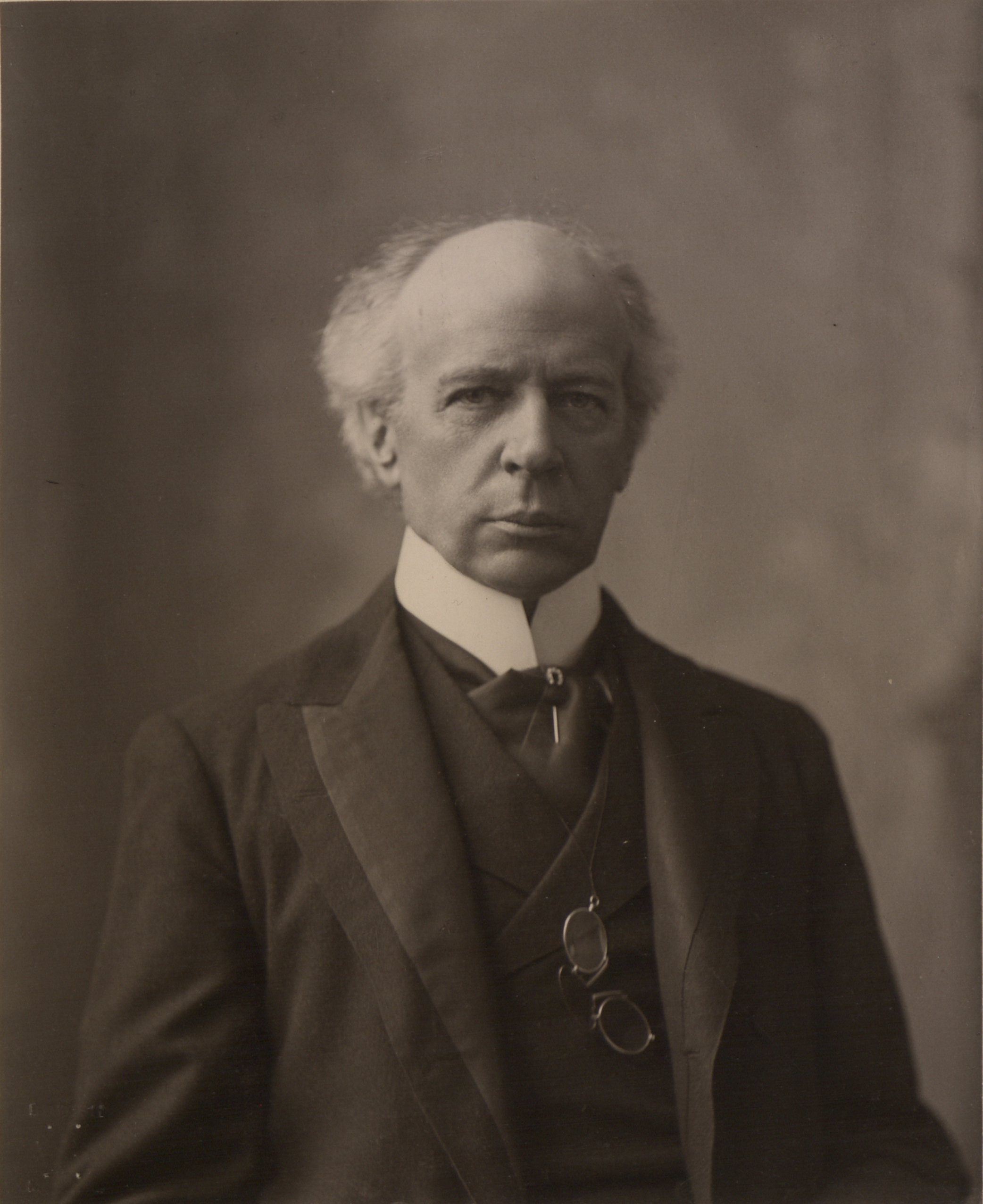
Wilfrid Laurier

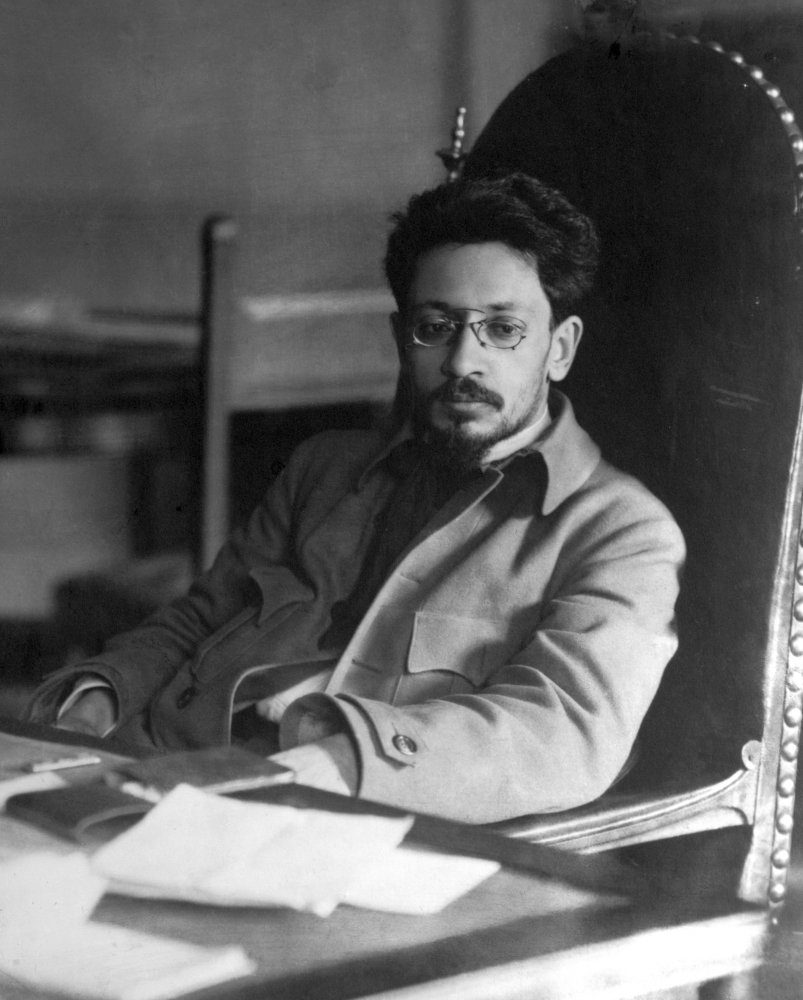
Yakov Sverdlov

- January 4 – Georg von Hertling, 7th Chancellor of Germany (b. 1843)
- January 6
  - Max Heindel, Christian occultist, astrologer and mystic (b. 1865)
  - Theodore Roosevelt, 26th President of the United States (b. 1858)
  - Jacques Vaché, French writer, associated with Surrealism (b. 1895)
- January 8 – Peter Altenberg, Austrian writer (b. 1859)
- January 10 – Wallace Clement Sabine, American physicist (b. 1868)
- January 15
  - Karl Liebknecht, German communist politician; assassinated (b. 1871)
  - Rosa Luxemburg, German communist politician; assassinated (b. 1871)
- January 16
  - Rodrigues Alves, Brazilian politician, 5th President of Brazil; Spanish flu (b. 1848)
  - Ismail Kemal, Albanian politician, 1st Prime Minister of Albania (b. 1844)
- January 18
  - Prince John of the United Kingdom; epilepsy (b. 1905)
  - Archduke Ludwig Viktor of Austria (b. 1842)
- January 21
  - Gojong, first Emperor of Korea (b. 1852)
  - Alexis, Prince of Bentheim and Steinfurt (b. 1881)
- January 22 – Carl Larsson, Swedish painter (b. 1853)
- January 27
  - Endre Ady, Hungarian poet (b. 1877)
  - Nikolai Iudovich Ivanov, Russian general (b. 1851)
- January 28
  - Franz Mehring, German communist politician (b. 1846)
  - Grand Duke Dmitry Konstantinovich of Russia (b. 1860)
- January 31 – Nat Goodwin, American actor and comedian (b. 1857)

=== February ===
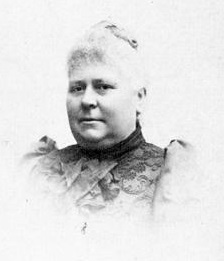
Augusta Lundin

- February 14 – Pál Luthár, Slovene teacher, cantor and writer (b. 1839)
- February 17 – Sir Wilfrid Laurier, 7th Prime Minister of Canada (b. 1841)
- February 19 – Melchora Aquino, Filipino revolutionary hero (b. 1812)
- February 20
  - Habibullah Khan, Emir of Afghanistan; assassinated (b. 1872)
  - Augusta Lundin, Swedish fashion designer (b. 1840)
- February 21
  - Kurt Eisner, German socialist revolutionary; assassinated (b. 1867)
  - Prince Karl Anton of Hohenzollern (b. 1868)
  - Mary Edwards Walker, American physician (b. 1832)
- February 26 – Mollie McNutt, Australian poet (b. 1885)

=== March ===
- March 5 – Ernest von Koerber, Austrian politician, former Prime Minister (b. 1850)
- March 16 – Yakov Sverdlov, Bolshevik revolutionary and politician, Spanish flu (b. 1885)

=== April ===
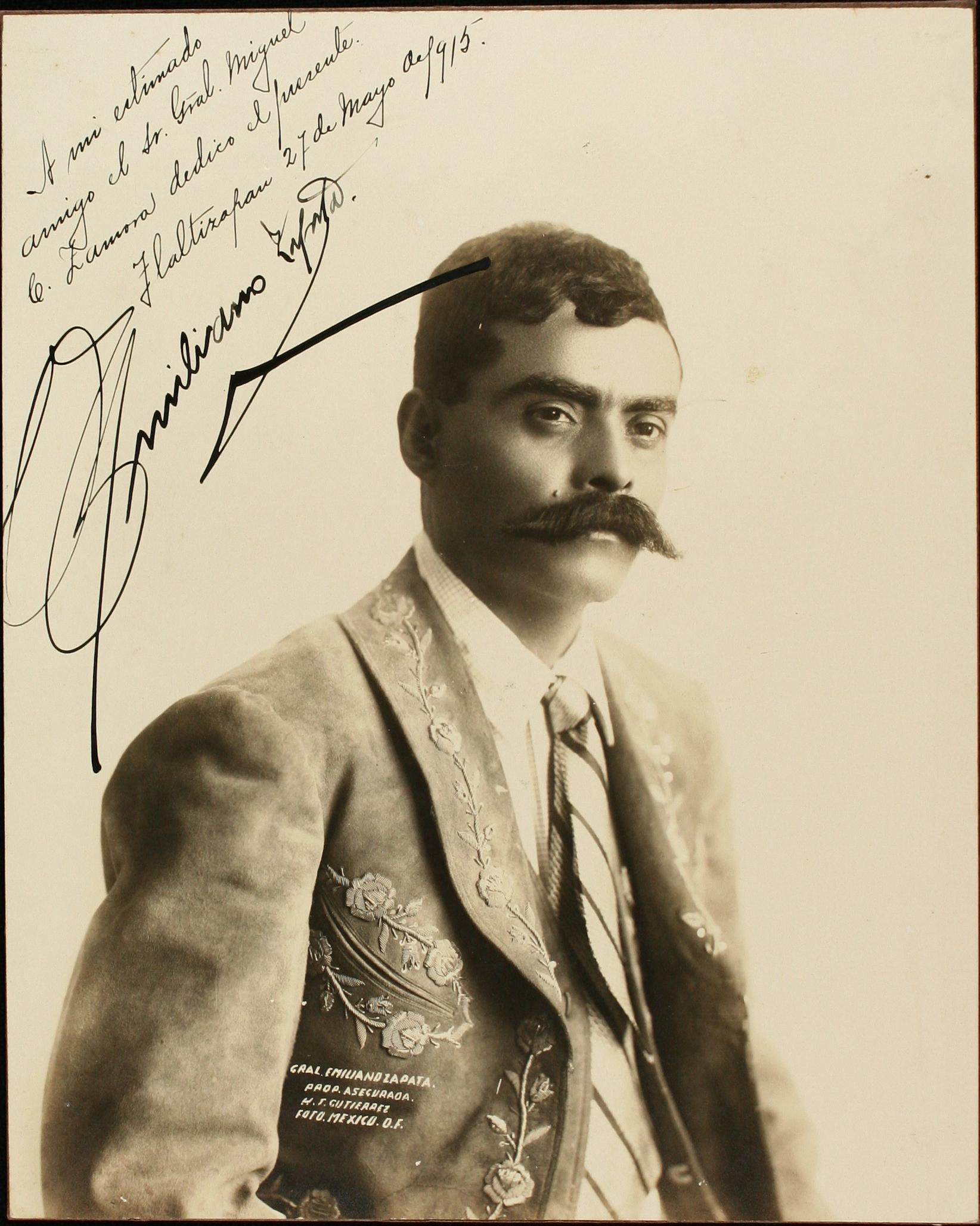
Emiliano Zapata

- April 4
  - Sir William Crookes, English chemist and physicist (b. 1832)
  - Francisco Marto, Portuguese witness of Marian apparitions, canonized, Spanish flu (b. 1908)
- April 5 – Harutiun Alpiar, Ottoman Armenian journalist and humorous writer (b. 1864)
- April 8 – Frank Winfield Woolworth, American businessman (b. 1852)
- April 10 – Emiliano Zapata, Mexican revolutionary, assassinated (b. 1879)
- April 14 – Auguste-Réal Angers, Canadian judge and politician, 6th Lieutenant Governor of Quebec (b. 1837)
- April 15 – Jane Delano, American nurse, founder of the American Red Cross Nursing Service (b. 1862)
- April 19 – Andrei Eberhardt, Russian admiral (b. 1856)
- April 21 – Jules Védrines, French pre-war aviator and World War I pilot, aviation accident (b. 1881)
- April 23 – Prince Tsunehisa Takeda, member of the Japanese imperial family, Spanish flu (b. 1882)
- April 27 – María Antonia Bandrés Elósegui, Spanish Roman Catholic religious professed and blessed (b. 1898)

=== May ===
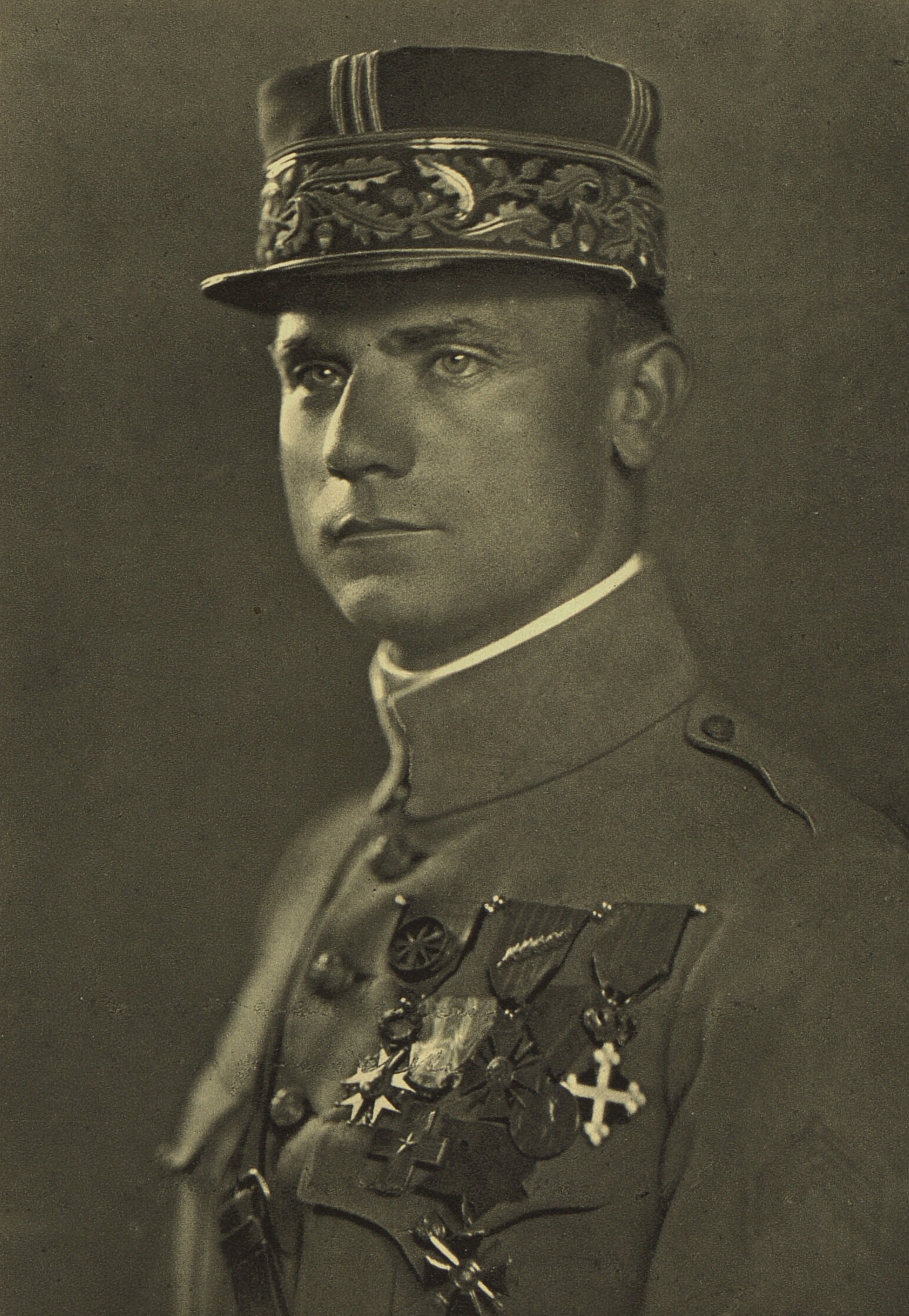
Milan Rastislav Štefánik

- May 2 – Gustav Landauer, German anarchist, assassinated (b. 1870)
- May 4 – Milan Rastislav Štefánik, Slovak general, politician and astronomer (b. 1880)
- May 6 – L. Frank Baum, American author, poet, playwright, actor and independent filmmaker (The Wizard of Oz) (b. 1856)
- May 9 – Juan Isidro Jimenes Pereyra, Dominican political figure, twice President of the Dominican Republic (b. 1846)
- May 14 – Henry J. Heinz, American entrepreneur (b. 1844)
- May 15 – Aaron Aaronsohn, Romanian-born Israeli botanist (b. 1876)
- May 21 – Victor Segalen, French naval doctor, ethnographer, archeologist, writer, poet, explorer, art-theorist, linguist and literary critic (b. 1878)
- May 25 – Madam C. J. Walker, African-American entrepreneur and philanthropist (b. 1867)
- May 28 – Hermann von Spaun, Austro-Hungarian admiral (b. 1833)

=== June ===
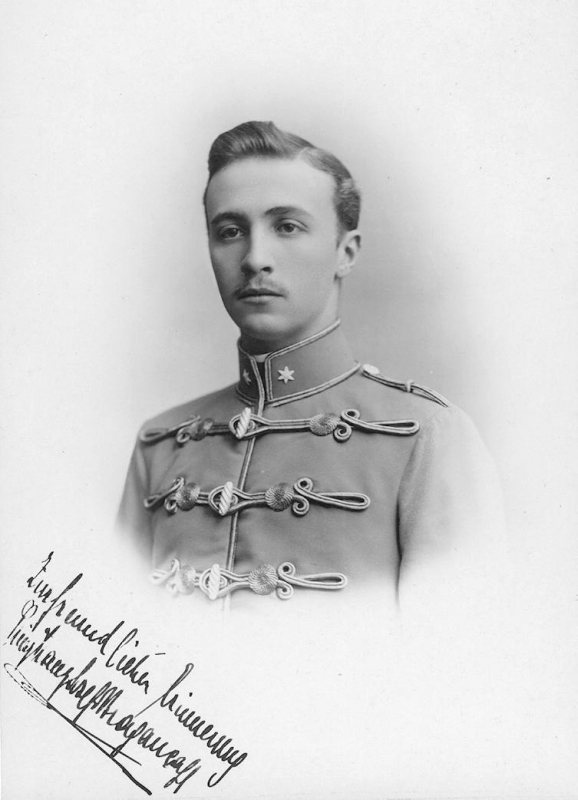
Prince Francisco José of Bragança

- June 1 – Caroline Still Anderson, American physician (b. 1848)
- June 5 – Eugen Leviné, German revolutionary, assassinated (b. 1883)
- June 6 – Frederic Thompson, American architect and showman (b. 1873)
- June 7 – Henning von Holtzendorff, German admiral (b. 1853)
- June 15 – Prince Francis Joseph of Braganza (b. 1879)
- June 19 – Petre P. Carp, twice Prime Minister of Romania (b. 1837)
- June 29
  - José Gregorio Hernández, Venezuelan physician, Roman Catholic venerable (b. 1864)
  - Alexander Ragoza, Russian general and Ukrainian politician, executed (b. 1858)
- June 30 – John William Strutt, 3rd Baron Rayleigh, English physicist, Nobel Prize laureate (b. 1842)

=== July ===
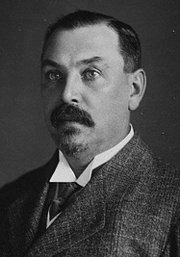
Louis Botha

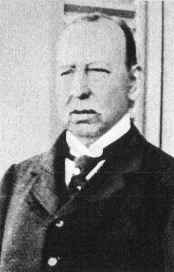
Victorino de la Plaza

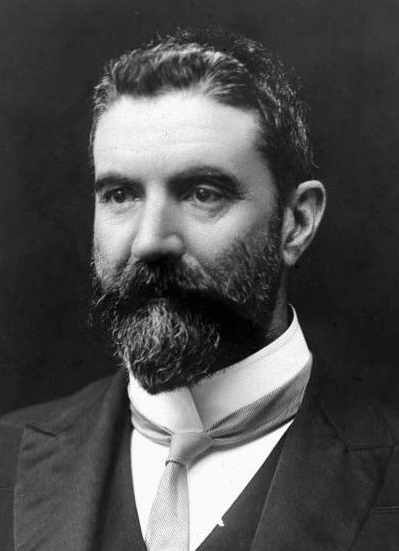
Alfred Deakin

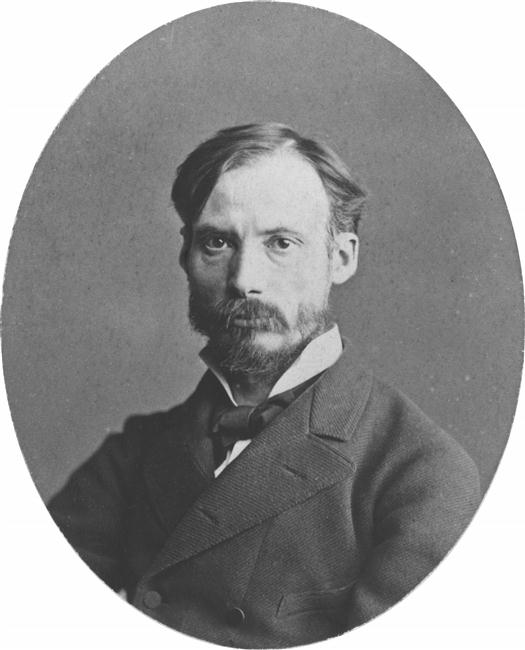
Pierre-Auguste Renoir

- July 2 – Friedrich Soennecken, German entrepreneur, inventor of hole punch and ring binder (b. 1848)
- July 10 – Jean Navarre, French World War I fighter ace, aviation accident (b. 1895)
- July 15 – Emil Fischer, German chemist, Nobel Prize laureate (b. 1852)
- July 18 – Raymonde de Laroche, French aviator, first woman to receive an aviator's license, aviation accident (b. 1882)
- July 21
  - Eremia Grigorescu, Romanian general (b. 1863)
  - Gustaf Retzius, Swedish physician and anatomist (b. 1842)
- July 26 – Sir Edward Poynter, British painter (b. 1836)
- July 27 – Charles Conrad Abbott, American naturalist (b. 1848)

=== August ===
- August 1 – Oscar Hammerstein I, Polish-born theater impresario and composer (b. 1847)
- August 2 – Tullo Morgagni, Italian journalist, sports race organizer, and aviation enthusiast; killed in airplane crash (b. 1881)
- August 9
  - Ralph Albert Blakelock, American romanticist painter (b. 1847)
  - Ernst Haeckel, German biologist, naturalist and philosopher (b. 1834)
  - Ruggero Leoncavallo, Italian composer (b. 1857)
- August 11 – Andrew Carnegie, Scottish-born businessman and philanthropist (b. 1835)
- August 24 – Friedrich Naumann, German politician and pastor (b. 1860)
- August 27 – Louis Botha, Boer general, statesman, 1st Prime Minister of South Africa; Spanish flu (b. 1862)

=== September ===
- September 20 – Ramón Barros Luco, 15th President of Chile (b. 1835)
- September 22 – Alajos Gáspár, Slovene writer in Hungary (b. 1848)
- September 27 – Adelina Patti, Italian opera singer (b. 1843)
- September 28 – Venancio Antonio Morin, Venezuelan military officer and politician (b. 1843).
- September 29 – Masataka Kawase, a.k.a. Kogorō Ishikawa, Japanese political activist and diplomat (b. 1840)

=== October ===
- October 1 – Princess Charlotte of Prussia, German royal (b. 1850)
- October 2 – Victorino de la Plaza, Argentinian politician, 18th President of Argentina, leader (b. 1840)
- October 6 – Ricardo Palma, Peruvian writer (b. 1833)
- October 7 – Alfred Deakin, 2nd Prime Minister of Australia (b. 1856)
- October 11 – Karl Adolph Gjellerup, Danish writer, Nobel Prize laureate (b. 1857)
- October 18 – William Waldorf Astor, 1st Viscount Astor, American financier and statesman (b. 1848)
- October 22 – John Cyril Porte, Irish-born British flying boat pioneer, tuberculosis (b. 1884)

=== November ===
- November 3 – Terauchi Masatake, 9th Prime Minister of Japan (b. 1852)
- November 7 – Hugo Haase, German Socialist politician and jurist (b. 1863)
- November 9 – Eduard Müller, Swiss Federal Councillor (b. 1848)
- November 15 – Alfred Werner, German chemist, Nobel Prize laureate (b. 1866)

=== December ===
- December 2
  - Henry Clay Frick, American industrialist (b. 1849)
  - Sir Evelyn Wood, British field marshal, Victoria Cross recipient (b. 1838)
- December 3 – Pierre-Auguste Renoir, French painter (b. 1841)
- December 11 – Sentō Takenaka, Japanese admiral (b. 1864)
- December 12 – Feng Guozhang, Chinese general (b. 1859)
- December 16 – Julia Lermontova, Russian chemist (b. 1846)
- December 19
  - Alice Moore McComas, American suffragist (b. 1850)
  - Martin Savage, Irish Republican Army commander; killed in action (b. 1898)
  - Sir John Alcock, English aviator; pilot of first nonstop transatlantic flight in airplane, June 1919; killed aviation accident (b. 1892)
- December 28 – Johannes Rydberg, Swedish physicist (b. 1854)

== Nobel Prizes ==

- Physics – Johannes Stark
- Chemistry – not awarded
- Physiology or Medicine – Jules Bordet
- Literature – Carl Friedrich Georg Spitteler
- Peace – Woodrow Wilson

== Sources ==
- Phelan, Paula (2007), 1919: Misfortune's End, ZAPmedia
