= Political terror in Finland and the Baltic states (1918–1919) =

Political terror in Finland and Baltic States during 1918–1920 occurred during violent political struggles within the Baltic territory of the Russian Empire disintegrated as a result of World War I and the Russian Revolution. While there were various militant actors in the scene, including German Army and the Russian White Movement from the remnants of the Russian Imperial Army, the major polarization was between "the Reds", or Bolshevik-influenced Communist revolutionaries, who wanted to establish the Soviet powers, and "the Whites" (not to be confused with Russian "Whites"), who wanted to establish independent states based on traditional democracy. Accordingly, the political terror during this period is roughly classified into the "Red Terror" and "White Terror".

== Overview ==
The four countries, Finland, Latvia, Lithuania, and Estonia had similar developments, all of them being the parts of the collapsed Russian Empire territorially close to each other and influenced by similar forces, with the exception of Lithuania, who had an additional conflict with Poland. Of these four, the bloodiest (and best researched) terror was in Finland (see Finnish Civil War § Red and White terror), where about 1,600 were killed in Red Terror and 8,100 killed in White Terror. The least organized political Red/White terror was in Lithuania, where about 100 persons were killed within this framework, mostly by anti-Bolshevik forces. (Note: The total death toll in Lithuania in this period was much higher due to military actions in the Polish–Lithuanian War and Lithuanian–Soviet War.) The Latvian civil war was the second bloodiest conflict in the region: with about 4500–6000 terror victims. In Estonia the numbers were smaller. Tomas Balkelis writes that an apparent imbalance in death tolls, similar in all cases, may be explained by the fact that the victors had more time to carry out the killings, but it may be a more complicated issue.

== Finland ==
According to the Finnish War Casualties database, the losses of "the Reds" (Red Guards), "the Whites", and others in the period may be summarized as follows:

Death toll in 1918
Death cause	Reds	Whites	Other	Total
Casualties in military actions	5,199	3,414	790	9,403
Executed, murdered	7,370	1,424	926	9,720
Died in prison camps	11,652	4	1,790	13,446
Died after being released from prison camps	607	-	6	613
Disappeared	1,767	46	380	2,193
Other ways of death	443	291	531	1,265
Totals	27,038	5,179	4,423	36,640

== Estonia ==
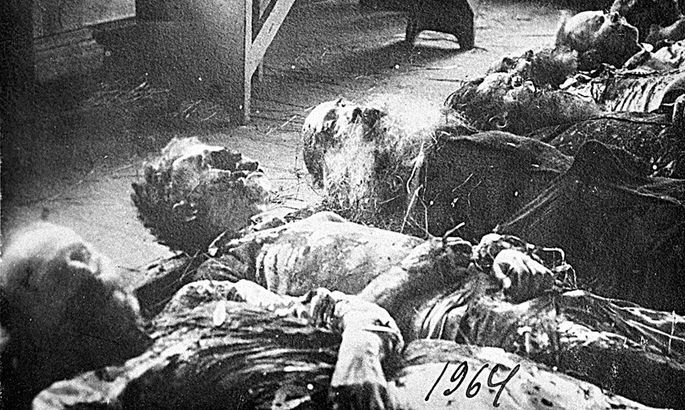
Corpses of victims of the 1919 Tartu Credit Center massacre killed by the retreating Bolsheviks

Soviet Estonian scholar Paul Vihalem gave an estimate of 2,000 victims among the "revolutionaries" (i.e., the Red Estonians), while the modern Estonian researcher Taavi Minnik suggests the number of 800 victims of the White Terror.

Among the victims of the white terror in Estonia were Red Finnish volunteers. The Estonian researcher Ants Jürman concludes that roughly 225 Finns were executed following the Battle of Narva (1919).

== Latvia ==
Latvia is estimated to have had a total of 4,500 to 6,000 victims of political terror (about 1,500 to 2,000 from the Red Terror and 3,000 to 4,000 from the White Terror), however, data from several regions, including Latgale, is incomplete.

=== Red Terror ===
Red Terror
- Part of Latvian War of Independence and Russian Civil War
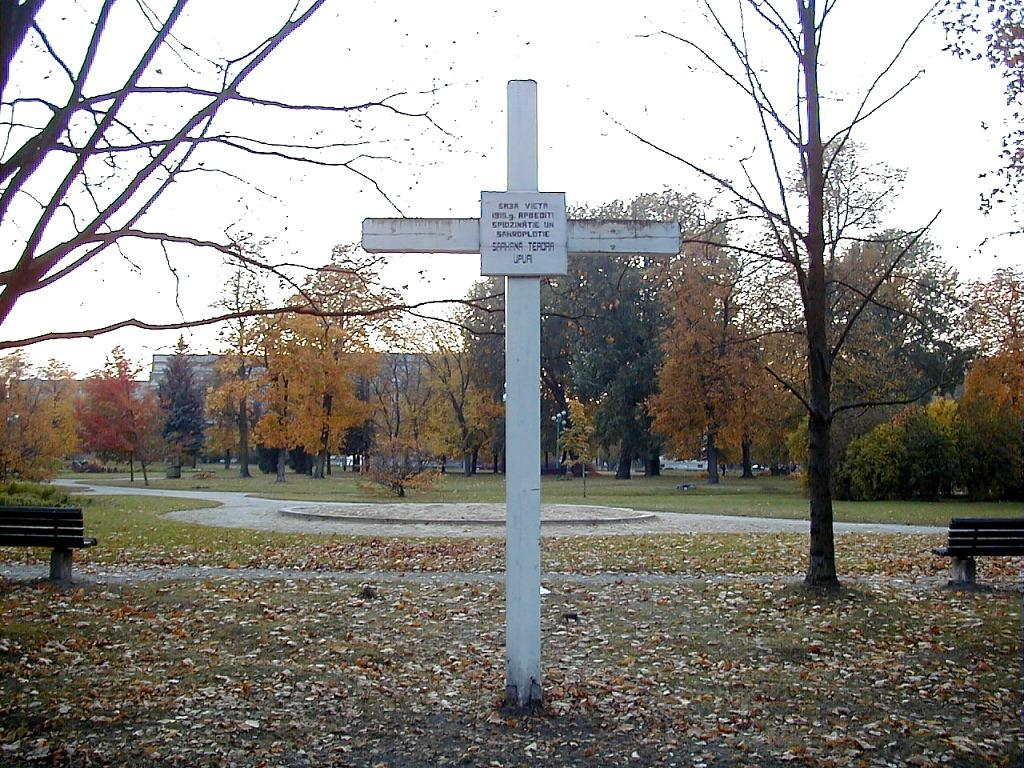
- A memorial cross in Jelgava marking the burial place of Red Terror victims killed in January, February, and March 1919 at Jelgava Prison.
- Location: Latvian Socialist Soviet Republic
- Date: November 1918–May 1919
- Target: Baltic Germans, Catholics, Jews, and other Anti-Bolsheviks
- Attack type: Politicide, mass murder, forced labour, political repression, political violence, sectarian violence, genocide
- Deaths: 2,000–5,000
- Perpetrators: Red Guards, Army of Soviet Latvia
- Motive: Bolshevism, anti-German sentiment, anti-clericalism

==== Background ====
The main organizer of Red Terror in Latvia was Jūlijs Daniševskis, Deputy Chairman of the Latvian Socialist Soviet Republic and de facto leader of the Soviet Latvian Army.

The campaign primarily targeted Baltic Germans, who made up roughly 90% of Bolshevik prisoners, reflecting ideological, social, and ethnic motives rather than actual acts of resistance. The terror was accompanied by xenophobic rhetoric and vilification, with individuals widely labeled as "enemies". Anti-Semitic incidents were relatively rare and generally ideologically motivated rather than organized pogroms. Jews were targeted mainly for violating Communist economic policies as "profiteers".

Executions, deportations, and hostage-taking were widespread, with prisoners often sent to Russian SFSR without registration. Hostages included members of the Latvian Provisional National Council and prominent Baltic Germans. The Red Terror also had an antireligious aspect, with churches desecrated and clergy attacked, though in Catholic Latgale local populations sometimes sheltered and protected religious figures from Bolshevik violence.

Red Terror unfolded in two stages: an initial "chaotic" phase (November 1918–mid-January 1919) marked by sporadic violence, and a "centralized" phase (mid-January–May 1919), during which revolutionary tribunals, concentration camps, and investigative commissions systematically eliminated perceived enemies. Victims of the Red Terror numbered between 2,000 and 5,000, while Bolshevik-established concentration camps and prisons held approximately 18,000 prisoners at their peak.

==== Implementation ====
In 1918, Pēteris Stučka, leader of the Latvian Bolsheviks, arrived in Riga from Moscow four days after the official foundation of the Republic of Latvia, with the aim of establishing a proletarian dictatorship. With Vladimir Lenin's approval, Stučka started to introduce a systematic campaign of political repression known as the "Red Terror," which lasted approximately five months.

The majority of Latvia's population, exhausted by World War I and German occupation, initially welcomed Pēteris Stučka-led Bolsheviks, hoping they would address longstanding issues such as land reform. Stučka's policies were radical even compared to Bolshevik practices in the Russian SFSR: while relying on the landless, his regime did not distribute land to peasants, but instead nationalized it and promoted collective farms as temporary measures toward socialism, aiming to demonstrate a "purer" form of Communism than that of the Russian SFSR, which quickly sparked widespread discontent among the population.

Revolutionary tribunals and the People's Court were established to eliminate perceived "counter-revolutionaries", a broadly defined category that included anyone not aligned with Bolshevik or anti-Bolshevik forces. These institutions enforced political control, often bypassing legal norms, and issued administrative penalties such as fines, arrests, and forced labor. Paramilitary formations such as the Red Guards, supported by the Red Army, enforced Bolshevik authority and participated in repression, including deportations. The first Revolutionary Tribunal was established in Vecgulbene on 18 December 1918 becoming one of Latvian Socialist Soviet Republic's most ruthless, holding three sessions in its first two weeks, in which it arrested 144, imprisoned 98, and executed 14 people.

On February 13, 1919, the Revolutionary Military Council of Soviet Latvia decided to create a network of concentration camps, nicknamed "menageries" for their brutal conditions, making it the first country to officially plan camps for mass political repression. The first camps were planned in Kurzeme and Vidzeme, with Stukmaņi in Vidzeme becoming the main facility. Housed in an abandoned glass factory, it quickly filled to over 1,600 prisoners, with outbreaks of disease and harsh conditions. The camp was closed on May 30, 1919, after Bolsheviks were driven out of Riga.

As anti-Bolshevik forces approached Riga in May 1919, the Bolsheviks intensified executions of prisoners. At the Citadel Prison, anti-Bolshevik troops were able to free hostages, but at Riga Central Prison, the Bolsheviks managed to kill 32 prisoners, including members of Baltic German clergy, using bayonets and grenades.

The Bolshevik rule lasted the longest in Latgale, persisting at least a year in most areas and nearly two years in its easternmost parts. In Daugavpils, the Red Terror reached its peak in March 1919 with the execution of 76 prominent public and economic figures in Dubrovin Park. In 1920, during the Liberation of Latgale, the retreating Bolsheviks took approximately 200 people, primarily Baltic Germans, as hostages to the Russian SFSR.

=== White Terror ===
White Terror
- Part of Latvian War of Independence and Russian Civil War
- Location: Republic of Latvia
- Date: December 1918–June 1919
- Target: Soviet Latvian Army soldiers and other Bolshevik supporters
- Attack type: Politicide, mass murder, political repression, political violence
- Deaths: 3,000–4,000
- Perpetrators: Baltische Landeswehr, Iron Division, Latvian Anti-Bolsheviks, and White Army
- Motive: Reprisal for Bolshevik atrocities, anti-communism

Anti-Bolshevik violence was primarily motivated by revenge rather than ideology. After joint forces of the Baltische Landeswehr, Iron Division, Latvian troops, and the White Army liberated Riga on May 22, 1919, a wave of reprisals was carried out against suspected Bolshevik supporters. Estimates of the victims vary widely: early official records cited 174, while the Latvian Social Democratic Workers' Party and communists claimed 4,000–5,000. Executions continued until June 1919 when Allied intervention halted them. Approximately 3,000 prisoners of war had fallen into the hands of the Landeswehr and Iron Division, some of whom were executed, while many others were released if vouched for and later joined Colonel Jānis Balodis' Latvian Separate Battalion. Overall, about 700 people are believed to have been killed in Riga (roughly 450 after tribunal verdicts and 250 without trial) with the largest documented execution occurring on June 5 at Riga Central Prison. The Iron Division and Landeswehr were particularly noted for their brutality, while Balodis' battalion oversaw fewer casualties.

The execution of 18 Bolsheviks by the German troops near Riga on 26 May 1919, was captured on film by an American motion picture crew. Shown at the Paris Peace Conference, the footage reportedly influenced the Allied decision to withdraw German forces from the Baltic states. Later included in the 1920 documentary Starvation, the sequence drew criticism for its graphic content and contributed to the film's failure, though the execution footage itself survived in Hoover Institution Library and Archives and has since reappeared in historical documentaries, often misidentified as an episode of Russian Civil War.

In December 1919, 29 local communists were arrested in Valmiera, 11 of which, including four young women, were executed after a brief court martial, shocking the public and sparking a parliamentary debate. The executed were initially buried without coffins, but later reburied amid protests and commemorations. The event became controversial and was later mythologized in Soviet propaganda.

== See also ==
- Red Terror (disambiguation)
- White Terror (disambiguation)
