= Constitution of the Latvian Socialist Soviet Republic =

Constitution of the Latvian SSR
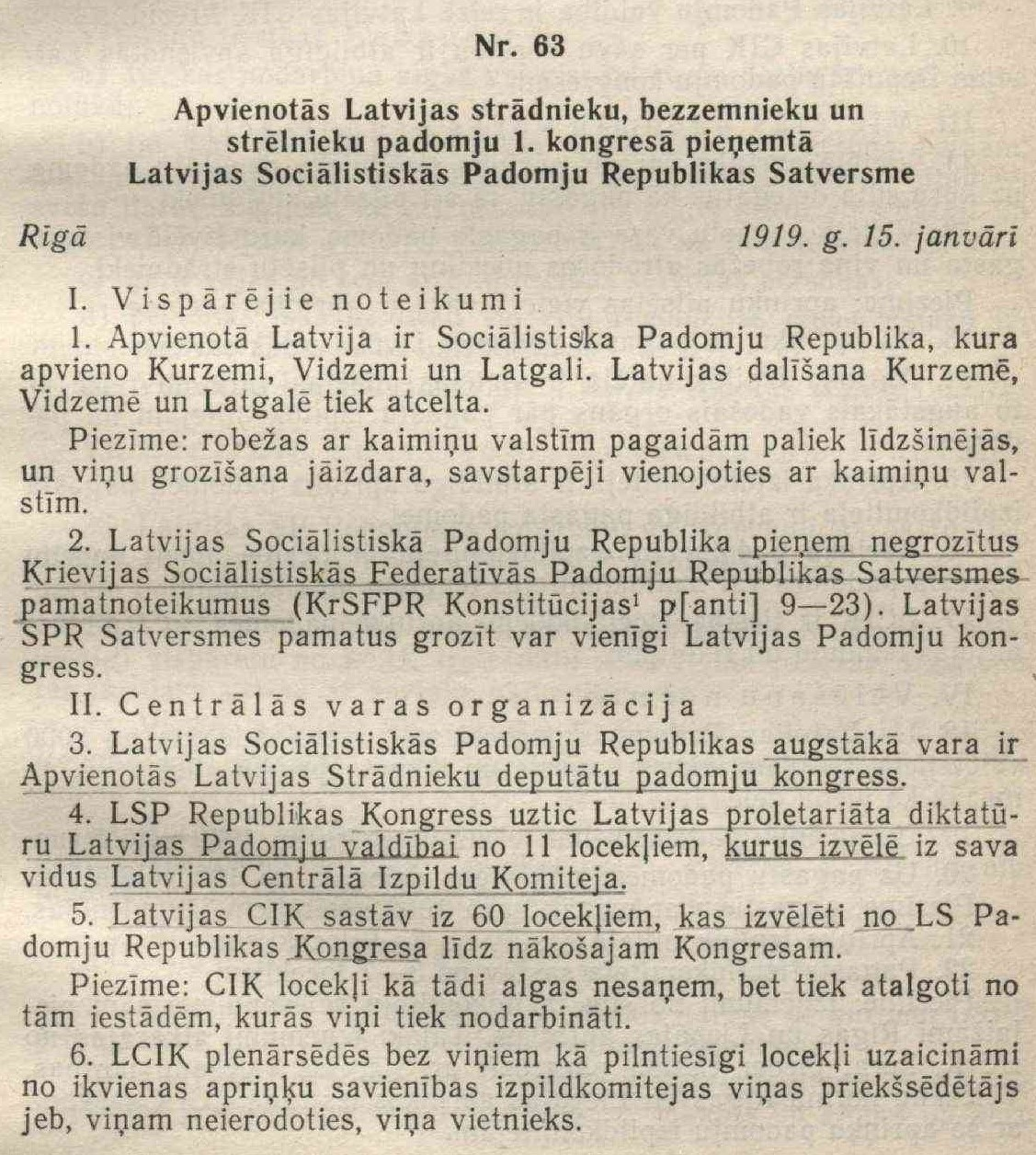

Overview
- Original title: Latvijas Sociālistiskās Padomju Republikas Satversme
- Jurisdiction: Latvian Socialist Soviet Republic
- Ratified: 15 January 1919
- Date effective: 15 January 1919
- Author(s): Executive Committee of the Soviet of Workers, Soldiers, and the Landless in Latvia
- Signatories: 10 signatories (1 chairman of the Sovnarkom of the Latvian SSR, 8 members of the Presidium of the CEC of the Latvian SSR, 1 secretary of the CEC of the Latvian SSR)

The Constitution of the Latvian Socialist Soviet Republic (Latvian: Latvijas Sociālistiskās Padomju Republikas Satversme) was the communist state constitution adopted by the 1st Congress of the Executive Committee of the Soviet of Workers, Soldiers, and the Landless in Latvia (Iskolat) on January 15, 1919. The constitution was the first constitution of the modern Latvia, prior to the adoption of the Constitution of Latvia on 7 November 1922.

The territory of the Latvian Socialist Soviet Republic, which includes Kurzeme, Vidzeme and Latgale, was rearranged into provinces. The Supreme Council of Latvian Workers' Deputies was appointed as the highest state authority of the Latvian SSR. The Congress elected the Latvian Central Executive Committee, whose members elected a presidium from among them, which was the government at the same time. The local Soviet government were the councils and executive bodies of the county councils and parish workers' deputies which acted as their executive committees. The Soviet congress and councils had the same standards of representation from cities and rural areas.

The section of the basic rights and duties of citizens were taken over from the 1918 Constitution of the Russian SFSR.

== History ==
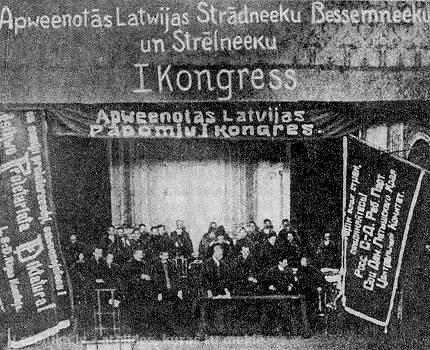
First Congress of the Iskolat.

On the establishment of the Latvian Socialist Soviet Republic on December 17, 1918, a manifest on the behalf of the Iskolat was declared. The manifest declared the establishment of communism in Latvia. This manifest led to the acknowledgement of the existence of the Latvian SSR by the Russian SFSR five days later, and as a basis for the promulgation of the constitution of the Latvian SSR on January 15, 1918.

The discussion for the constitution began during the 1st Congress of the Iskolat from 13 until 15 January 1919. The congress itself adopted two resolutions on the foreign relations and the elections. It was decided in the congress that the Latvian SSR opens mutual relations with the Russian SFSR as a foundation of the formation of the Soviet Union, and only the working class, included landless and riflemen, is allowed to participate in elections, to symbolize the power of the workers' councils in Latvia.

The constitution was adopted at the end of this congress, on 15 January 1919. The constitution was signed by Pēteris Stučka as the Chairman of the Council of People's Commissars of the Latvian Socialist Soviet Republic, the eight members of the Presidium of the CEC of the Latvian SSR, and J. Jaunzems as the Secretary of the CEC of the Latvian SSR.

The constitution itself lasted for only one year. On 13 January 1920, the Latvian SSR was disestablished, following its defeat in the Battle of Daugavpils.

== Signatories ==
Ten members of the government of the Latvian SSR signed the constitution.

- Pēteris Stučka (1865–1932)
- Jūlijs Daniševskis (1884–1938)
- Kārlis Pētersons (1877–1928)
- Rūdolfs Endrups (1887–1938)
- Jānis Lencmanis (1881–1939)
- Fricis Roziņš (1870–1919)
- Oto Kārkliņš (1884–1942)
- Jānis Bērziņš (1881—1938)
- Kārlis Krastiņš (1892–1932)
- Jānis Šilfs (1891–1921) (Note: Signed as Janis Jaunzems in the constitution.)

== Structure ==
The Constitution is divided into 7 chapters and 31 articles, making it the shortest Soviet constitution ever promulgated.

1. The Basic Provisions
2. The Organization of the Central Government
3. The Organization of Local Soviet Government
4. The Law on Elections
5. The Rights and Procedures of Elections
6. The Central and Local Income and Expenditure Budget
7. The Flag and Seal of the Latvian SSR
