= Battle of Riga (1919) =

Battle in 1919 during the Latvian War of Independence

- Part of Latvian War of Independence
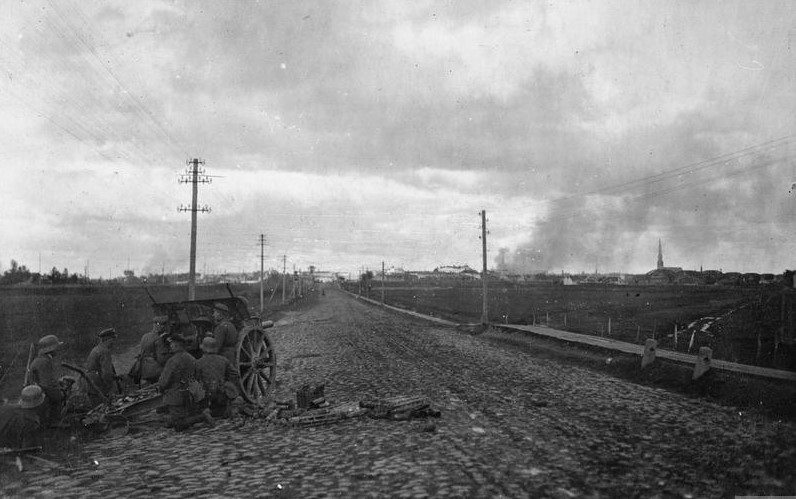
- Baltische Landeswehr attack on Riga during the battle, 22 May 1919
Date	22 – 23 May 1919: (1 day)
Location	Riga, Soviet Latvia: (Present-day Riga, Latvia); 56°56′56″N 24°6′23″E
Result	German–Latvian victory: Start of the White Terror in Riga

Belligerents
Baltische Landeswehr: Latvia; Iron Division; Minor involvement: (Russia) Lieven detachment	(Latvian Socialist Soviet Republic) Soviet Latvia

Commanders and leaders
(German Empire) Rüdiger von der Goltz: (German Empire) Alfred Fletcher; (Latvia) Jānis Balodis; (Latvia) Jānis Puriņš	(Latvian Socialist Soviet Republic) Jukums Vācietis

Units involved
Baltische Landeswehr: Iron Division; (Latvia) 2nd Cēsis Battalion; (Latvia) Southern Latvian Brigade	(Latvian Socialist Soviet Republic) Soviet Latvian Army

Strength
3,700 soldiers: (Latvia) 1,580 soldiers; 4,500 soldiers; 420 cavalrymen; 110 machine guns; 202 hand machine guns; 28 light guns; 8 heavy guns; (Russia) 400 soldiers; Total: 10,180 soldiers; 420 cavalrymen; 110 machine guns; 202 hand machine guns; 28 light guns; 8 heavy guns	(Latvian Socialist Soviet Republic) 4,324 soldiers: 57 machine guns; 12 light guns; 6 heavy guns; 54 machine guns; 1 armored train
- See Military size for more information

Casualties and losses
Unknown	Unknown
- White Terror in Riga: 174 – 5,000 killed; 4,000 captured; 3,000 arrested

Battle of Riga was a battle during the Latvian War of Independence that started on 22 May 1919, when the German troops under commander Rüdiger von der Goltz tried to occupy Riga against Soviet Latvia.

== Background ==
After successful liberation operations in Courland and Semigallia, the liberation of Riga was delayed. In the Baltische Landeswehr book of memories of the battles, it is said that the liberation of Riga was delayed by the government of Kārlis Ulmanis so the Latvian troops would do in the liberation. The delay of the liberation was said to be one of the reasons for the April Putsch in Liepāja.

On 7 May 1919, the countries of Entente submitted the first draft of the Treaty of Versailles to Germany and gave the diplomats 2 weeks to sign the treaty. In Article 433 of the treaty provided for a withdrawal of the German forces from the Baltic states, and prohibited German troops from interfering or introducing new German units to the countries.

Since the Landeswehr were too weak to liberate Riga alone, the liberation of the city became a political issue because they needed support from German troops, but since the Treaty of Versailles was signed the German forces couldn't help. In May, Rüdiger von der Goltz went to Berlin to get permission to liberate Riga, he was told that the liberation should be done by the Landeswehr alone and without the help of German forces, meaning the main attack would be carried by the Landeswehr.

The Landeswehr plan for the capture of Riga was to go through Iecava and Ikšķile, like done during the Riga offensive in 1917 and surround the city. But it wasn't possible since it wasn't supported by the government and would require forces from the 1st Guards Reserve Division. The Landeswehr only went up to the Jugla Line and Rüdiger von der Goltz moved from Liepāja to Jelgava. Later the German government gave Rüdiger von der Goltz freedom of action and distancing itself from the attack of Riga.

While Rüdiger von der Goltz planned the attack on Riga he also predicted to liberate Vidzeme, and capture Petrograd with Estonian and White movement forces. During the beginning of May, the Estonian military informed Rüdiger von der Goltz, that the Estonian forces wanted to occupy Gulbene and Krustpils and that meant liberating Vidzeme from the Bolsheviks, and Poland was starting to attack Daugavpils in the middle of May. For the Soviet troops in Latvia the worst scenario of the defeat of the Soviet Latvian Army was about to come true, and now retaining Riga became more complicated. On 23 April, the leader of the Red Army, Jukums Vācietis informed Vladimir Lenin that the decisive battles were on the eastern and southern fronts, and asked to send reinforcements there, since the western front wasn't that important at the time.

== Attack plan ==
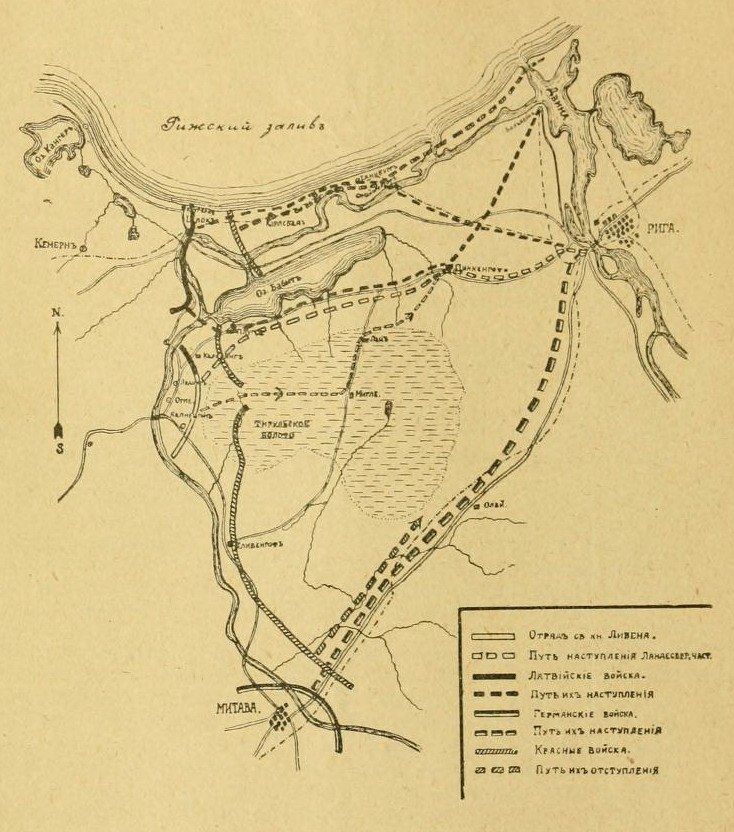
Operation of the Battle of Riga

Using the last opportunity for German forces, Rüdiger von der Goltz issued an order to attack Riga, and the attack would be led by Landeswehr commander Alfred Fletcher. The plan of attack called for the South Latvian Brigade and Landeswehr units to attack from positions located in Kalnciems and Sloka. The Iron Division, made up of German volunteers moved from Jugla to Riga to provide for the rear support for the attacking units. The York Division and the Bauska Battalion stationed in Bauska were to provide with the Right Wing, while the 1st Guards Reserve Division remained at the Lithuanian border just in case.

The attack was planned to start on 12 May, but was delayed because Andrievs Niedra was kidnapped by officers of the Latvian Provisional Government. After Andrievs Niedra managed to escape on 17 May, the attack was then planned on 22 May. At that time the White Forces were attacking Petrograd, and had reached Krasnoye Selo on 21 May. Soviet Latvia didn't receive any reinforcements, but were sent to more threatening sectors of the front in the north. Thus, the Soviet Latvia lost Riga without a fight. In Soviet history, the reason was explained by the strategic unfavorable front at the time, which wasn't planned to protect or hold Riga.

== Military size ==
According to Soviet forces, on the eve of the fall of Riga, Soviet Latvia had a 600km long front against Estonians, Germans and Poles. On 1 May, there were 28,180 soldiers, 827 cavalrymen, 605 machine guns, 98 cannons, some mortars, and 12 aircraft in the front. In the Soviet Latvian Army, there were 45,000 soldiers but in reality, there were much less, diseases and hunger were big problems in the army. Meanwhile, Rüdiger von der Goltz's VI Reserve Corps, deployed in a 170km long fort, had 40,000 soldiers.

The number of officers and soldiers on both sides is approximately known. The number of German forces and the Iron Division forces involved in the fighting is not clearly known, as the units following government restrictions, only performed rear guard functions. In the direction of Kalnciems and Sloka, the Landeswehr had 8 battalions, 6 squadrons and 4 batteries. 3,700 people in three German battalions, 1,580 in three Latvian battalions, 400 people in Anatol von Lieven's Russian battalion and 400 people in Valters fon Mēdem's battalion. In total, there were 663 officers, 5,405 soldiers, 84 machine guns, 72 machine guns and 17 canons. The Red Army opposite five battalions of the 1st and 2nd Division, a total of 1,784 soldiers, 57 machine guns, 6 light and 2 heavy guns, in total, there were in the direction of Kalnciems in Sloka 3,610 people in these units.

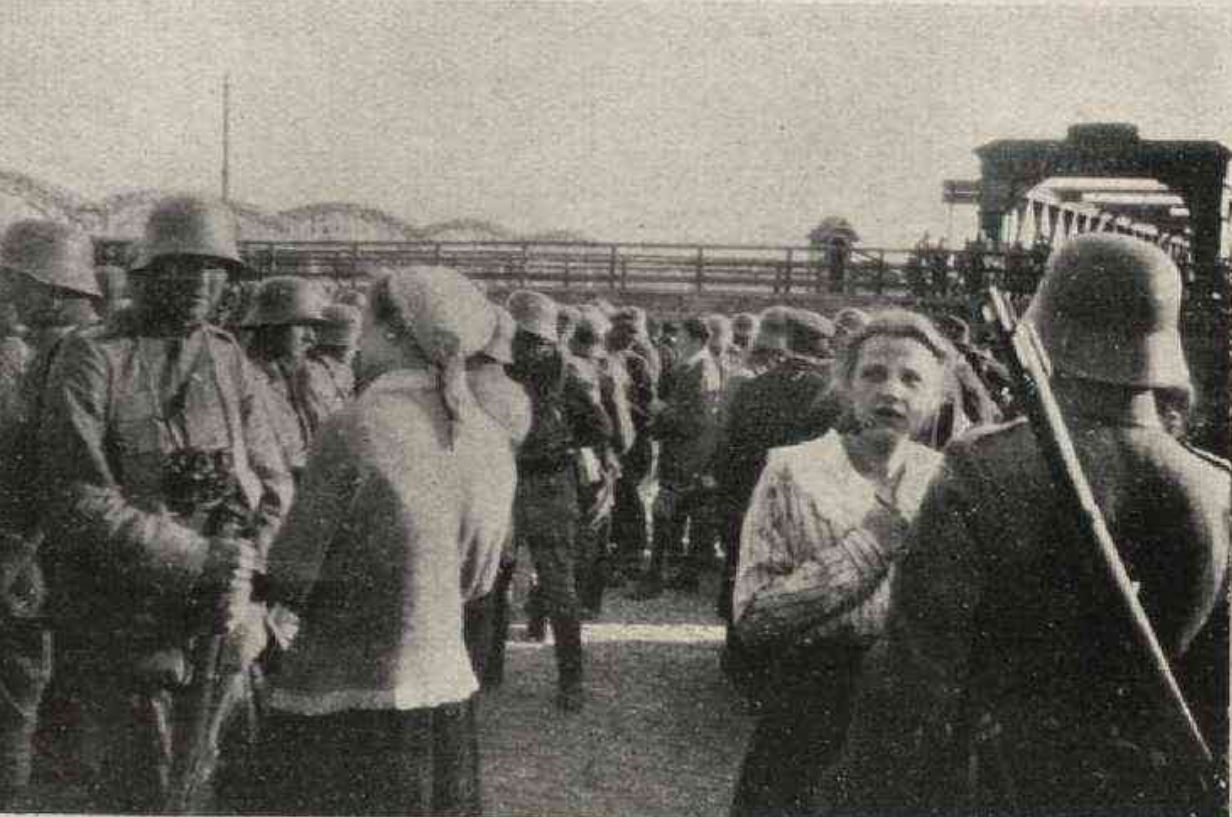
People next to the Daugava bridges during the Battle, 22 May

In the direction of Jelgava, the Iron Division, which played a supporting role, had 9 battalions with 4,500 soldiers, 420 cavalrymen, 110 machine guns, 202 hand machine guns, 28 light and 8 heavy guns took part in the battles. Against the Iron Division, the Red Army put 8 battalions with 2,540 soldiers, 54 machine guns, 6 light and 4 heavy guns and one armored train, in total there were in the Jelgava direction 4,512 men. Soviet historians calculated up to 15,000 men in Landeswehr and the Iron Division soldiers attacked Riga, while a maximum of 8,127 Soviet soldiers and officers defended it.

When a large-scale attack started in the Lielupe front located in present-day Jūrmala to Jelgava on the night of 22 May, 663 officers and 5,405 soldiers with 17 cannons, 72 light and 84 heavy machine guns, 8 mortars and 3 grenade launchers, and 2,062 horses fought on the side of Landeswehr. On the other side of Soviet Latvia had the 1st, 2nd, 3rd, 10th and 16th rifle regiments, the 1st Daugavgrīva fortress regiment, 2 sapper companies, 4 squadrons, 2 heavy and 1 howitzer battery, 1 armored train and 2 armored cars. The total size of the Bolshevik forces was estimated up to 10,000 and 14,000 men but were confirmed to be greatly exaggerated.

== The battle ==
Alfred Fletcher divided his troops into three different groups, the first group he commanded himself. The group included an Assault Battalion with a half-battery of artillery, Valters fon Mēdem's German volunteer unit, a sapper unit, Engelhard's unit, one Latvian company, one Latvian cavalry squadron and the Malmède battalion. At 1:30 AM on 22 May, the first group started an attack from Kalnciems and from Grabe's houses, Skangalai and Komandieru road heading in the direction of Dzilnuciems. The success of the attack was ensured by German pilots led by Sachsenberg. The planes not only fired at the Bolshevik forces, but also carried out reconnaissance and relayed situational reports to the commanders.

The second group was commanded by Jānis Balodis, the group consisted of Eilenberg's battalion, an artillery half-battery, Drachenfeld's cavalry unit, Anatol von Lieven's unit, 1st battalion of the Southern Latvian Brigade and one company from the 3rd battalion. At 4:30 AM, the second group started an attack near Ogli hourse, which was close to Tīreļi, moving along the southern shore of the Babīte lake, then at the direction through Pietini, Bliodnieki, Dzilnā, along Ložmetējkalnu and Krievu hill, went towards Piņķi and Pūpa (Babīte).

The third group was commanded by Jānis Purinš, it included two companies and one cavalry squadron of the Southern Latvian Brigade, as well as the 2nd Cēsis Battalion, left in reserve. The group was supported by 4 Lielupe boats and two ferries, which were equipped with machine guns and the guns of Bart's battery. The group went through Sloka, Kaugurciems and through the entire city of Jurmala and along the northern shore of Babīte Lake and then reaching Priedaine Station.

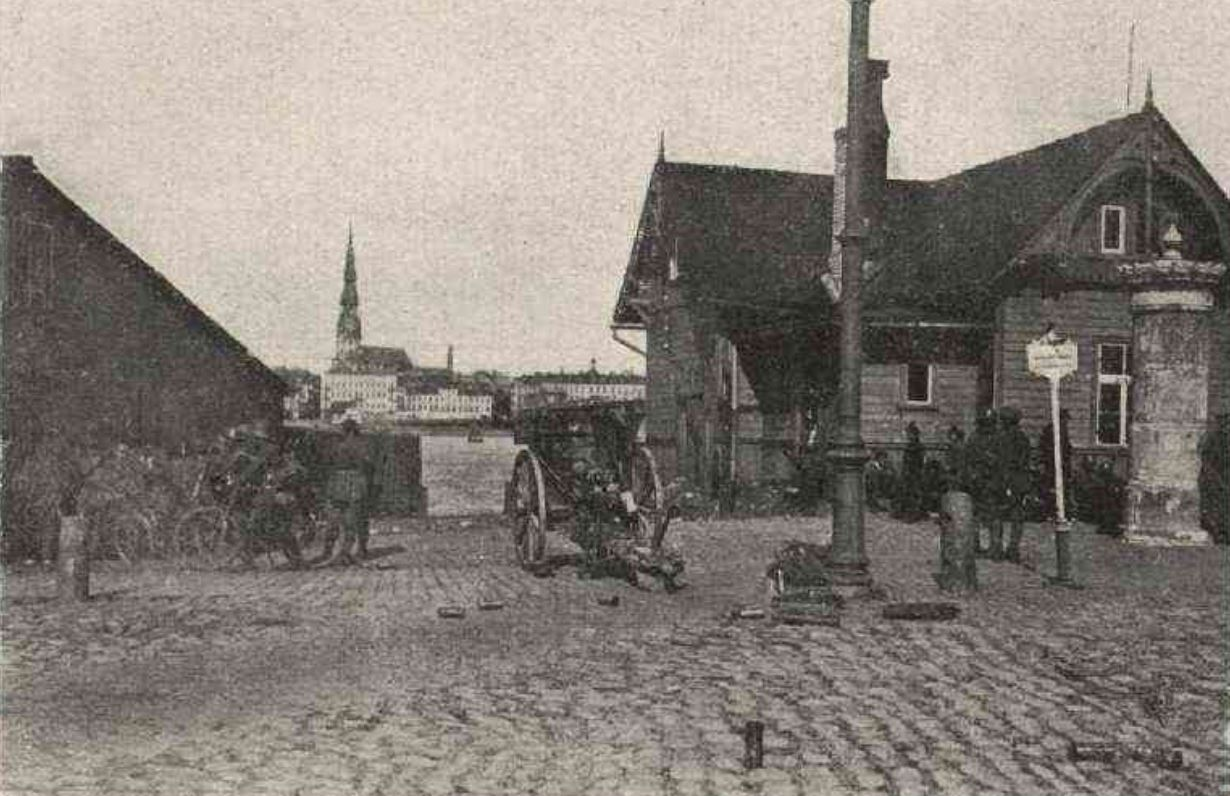
Artillery support in Pārdaugava, 22 May 1919

The Soviet Latvian Army showed resistance in the fortifications located between Sloka and Asari, which was overcome around 11 o'clock. Around the same time, Alfred Fletcher's and Jānis Balodis's columns joined each other at Dzilnuciema. The order arrived for the Germans and Latvians and they continued separately. The Germans arrived at Riga early since the road was unprotected, but for the Jānis Balodis group, they needed to occupy Piņkis and Pūpi to connect with Jānis Puriņš group at the Bulduri bridge so they could block the way for Bolsheviks to retreat and flee away from Jūrmala. Since Jānis Balodis and Jānis Puriņš reorganized, the Bolsheviks managed to gain a foothold in the Pinki Manor, the cemetery and the church. After shooting the Bolsheviks retreated to Pūpa and then to Daugavgrīva, where they moved to the right bank of Daugava River. On 23 May, the dove column got to Pinkai and led by Jānis Puriņš, liberated Jūrmala in street battles and occupied Priedaine Station and Lielupe bridge near Bulduri at around 18:00.

The Iron Division started its attack in the morning after 1.5 hours of artillery fire and captured Olaine around noon. Part of the Iron Division went to Ķekava but the main force went to Riga.

Meanwhile, Alfred Fletcher's column, Valters fon Mēdem's corps and the Strike Group under the leadership of Hanss fon Manteifels-Cēge captured Zasulauks in the morning due to a rapid attack and reached the Daugava bridges around 11:00 and started invading Vecrīga. The appearance of Landeswehr was a surprise to the Bolsheviks since they thought that the fight was continuing in the Tireļpurva area. The small attacking group began to be fired upon from building. Soon after crossing the bridge a large unit of 10 soldiers came with a light cannon and 2 machine guns under the leadership of von Manteifel and Valters fon Mēdem, went to the Riga Citadel, where there were hundreds of imprisoned anti-Bolsheviks, and in the attack Mateifelis falls, but manages to reach the Citadel and free the prisoners.

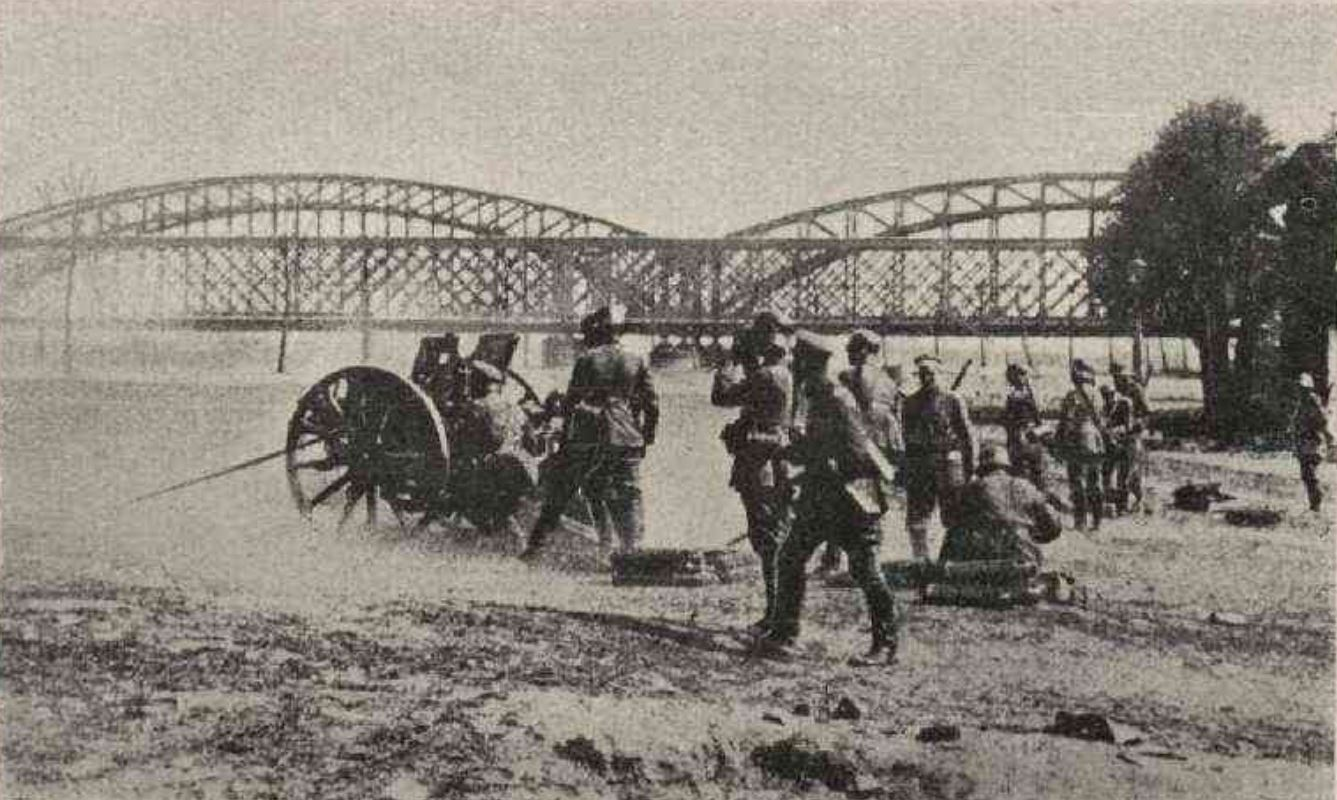
Railway Bridge during the Battle of Riga

The fight on the bridge lasted for 2 hours and stopped at around 13:30 and the embankment was critical. Then the rest of Alfred Fletcher's forces and the Iron Division arrived and started to attack deeper into the city and established a corridor with Manteifel's units in that liberated the citadel. The biggest street fights started at present-day Brīvības iela, Ģertrūdes iela and Miera iela and continued till around 19:00. In Riga they managed to seize many trains, the state treasury of Soviet Latvia and a large part of the Red Army artillery. While the Bolsheviks retreated they managed to shoot 60 prisoners, which mainly were German nobles and priests in the Riga and the prison was liberated 30 minutes later. At around 18:00, Anatol von Lieven's department came to Riga and was sent to Mangaļsala at North of Riga.

The Landeswehr reported around 11 dead, but the total number when liberating Riga isn't precisely known. Kārlis Ziedinš, the head administrative of Soviet Latvia, who participated in the capture of Winter Palace during the October Revolution, also fell in the battles. The fallen von Manteifel was solemnly taken out of the Cathedral and buried in the cemetery of his native Kazdang Palace.

== Aftermath ==
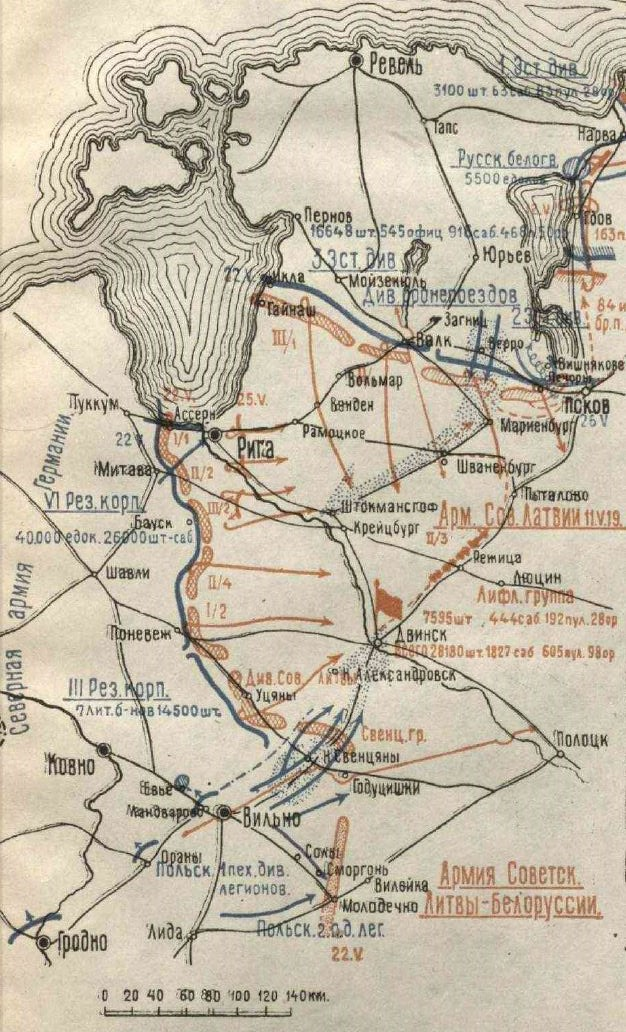
In May 1919, Soviet Latvia was forced to retreat to a safer front in Latgale

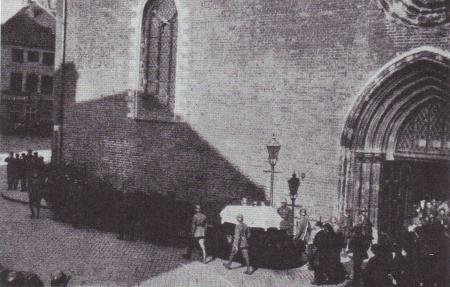
Picture of Hans von Manteifel-Szoege after dying during the Battle of Riga, 22 May

On 23 May, the frontline stretched along from Mīlgrāvis, Ķīšezers, the Jugla Lake, Ikšķile and Ķekava. The units of the Southern Latvian Brigade, commanded by Jānis Balodis and the Separate Student Troupe entered Riga with the Latvian flag in the morning at about 9:00, and were greeted by the residents in the Daugava embankment. The units commanded by Jānis Balodis went to the barracks on Pärnavas Street, participated in the cleansing of the city and the recruitment of new Latvian soldier units began immediately. After a short rest, only the 3rd battalion of the Southern Latvian Brigade or also Separate Student Troupe remained in Riga and helped and continued to perform the city's garrison duties.

The next day on 24 May, the 1st and 2nd battalions, together with two cavalry squadrons, were ordered to pursue the Bolsheviks and went to the Gauja river which was near Ādaži. Anatol von Lieven's units were informed to go from Vecmīlgrāvis to the Ropaži Station to dismantle the train tracks and then go to Jugla, but around that Anatol von Lievens was injured from a shooting near Alderi. Meanwhile, many Latvian Riflemen deserted from the Soviet Latvian Army and joined the brigade commanded by Jānis Balodis. Later the 4th Riga Battalion was established in Vecpiebalga and the 8th Piebalga Battalion was established in Vējava.

The last Red Army soldiers left Daugavgrīva fortress on 25 May and Andrievs Niedra returned from Jelgava to Riga on 26 May. On 28 May, Latvian soldiers held a parade in honor of the US mission at the corner of Suvorova and Elizabetes streets. Rüdiger von der Goltz arrived in Riga, and on 29 May and he accepted a parade for the units that participated in the Battle of Riga.

Although the Red Army received reinforcements of three regiments and two armoured trains, one of the Red Army fronts in the Pechory region. The commander of Soviet Estonia division with his headquarters and his soldiers went to the Estonian side, which led to the fall of Pskov and complicated the situation in Soviet Latvia. The Red Army tried to build defenses near Alūksne and Pytalovo to resist Estonian attacks heading to Krustpils, but failed and on 5 June, Estonia and Danish-Baltic Auxiliary Corps forces occupied Krustpils. The front in Latgale stabilizes but the Polish attack only got to Ignalina.

== White Terror in Riga ==
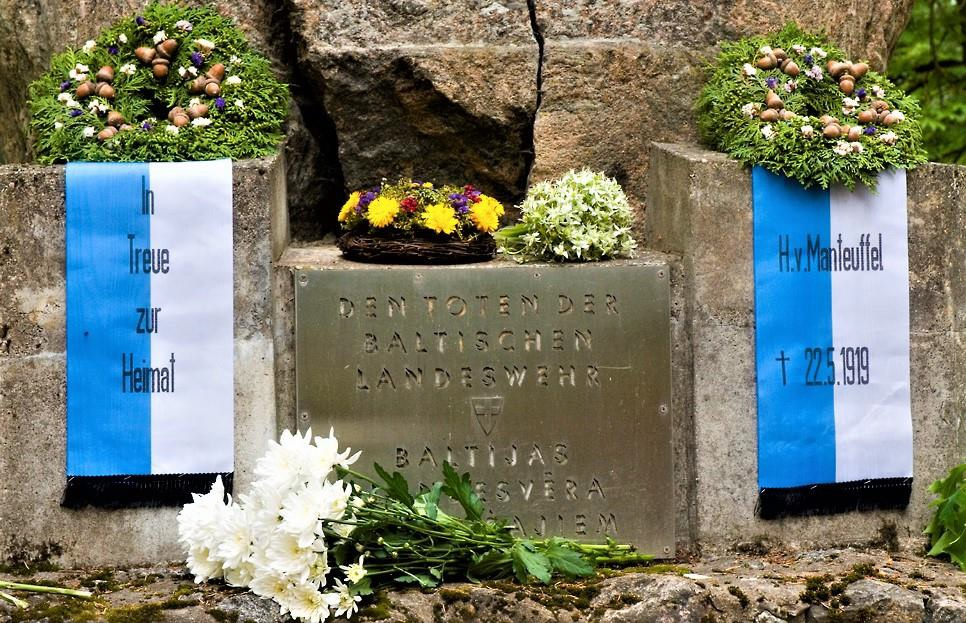
Hans von Manteifel-Szoege's grave today

The White Terror started in Riga during and after the Battle of Riga on 22 May and lasted more than a month until July 5 killing civilians, prisoners of war and political suspects and in total killed 174 according to the head of Rīga's Gendarmerie and up to 4,000 - 5,000 people according to local social democrats and communists, and the Germans are usually blamed.

The Battle of Riga was a surprise for many employees of Soviet Latvian institutions, who went to work in the morning, but then ran away and hid. It's thought to be the start of the shootings since the place was full of suspicious people. The people most at risk were living in working-class neighborhoods, those wearing military-looking clothes, and women with shorter hair, considered a sign of revolutionary "plinth girls". Alfred Fletcher declared martial law in Riga to hand over all weapons, ordered the employees of the Soviet authorities to report to the police and prohibited the citizens from being on the streets from 6 in the evening to 6 in the morning.

On 23 May, Landeswehr began a full-scale cleansing of the city, killing at least several hundred suspects, on the same day the brigade commanded by Jānis Balodis, was ordered to clean the area between Brīvības, Avota and Deglava streets, starting from the Elizabeth street. The Latvian soldiers usually released the detainees quickly after the investigation, and the large part of the brigade commanded by Jānis Balodis soon left Riga. The participation of the Separate Student Troupe in the cleansing is unclear since they helped and continued to perform the city's garrison duties.

During the cleaning of the city blocks, armed resistance was allegedly everywhere. In the first few days, alleged suspects were simply shot in the streets. In Marija Street 10 Bolsheviks were shot, because they resisted in the theatre boulevard and were thrown into the city canal, but were pulled out on 26 May. At least 204 people were brought to the Matīsa cemetery. The number of people suspected and Red Army men captured quickly grew to over 3,000. Later the suspected people that were shot were buried near the Riga Central Prison. On 29 May, the arrests of suspected people took place in Riga again and people who were on the street after 6 in the evening were detained. Escaped detainees were still publicly shot in the streets and anyone who tried to resist the soldiers.

On 28 May, instead of uncontrolled shooting, field courts-martial were established, including representatives of 2 Germans, 2 Latvians and 1 minority. The composition of the courts-martial also points to the participation of Latvians in terror but continued to impose death sentences. More than 300 people were shot and died in Pārdaugava following the decisions of the court-martial. On June 9 executions stopped after protests by representatives of the British and American missions. Mass shootings continued through the month of June.

The White Terror in Riga ended in June 1919 after Allied intervention and on 5 July the Germans left the city.

== See also ==
- Latvian War of Independence
- Freikorps in the Baltic
- Baltische Landeswehr
- Latvian Socialist Soviet Republic
- Ober Ost
- Battle of Cēsis (1919)
