= Latvian Republics =

Four states have borne the name Latvian Republic (Latvijas Republika) since the proclamation of the independence in 1918:

- Latvian Socialist Soviet Republic (1918-1920), an independent Soviet Latvian state
- First Latvian Republic
- Latvian Soviet Socialist Republic (1940-1991), a constituent republic of the Soviet Union
- Second Latvian Republic
