= Ufa electoral district =

Constituency of the Russian Republic

Ufa
- Former Civilian constituency for the All-Russian Constituent Assembly
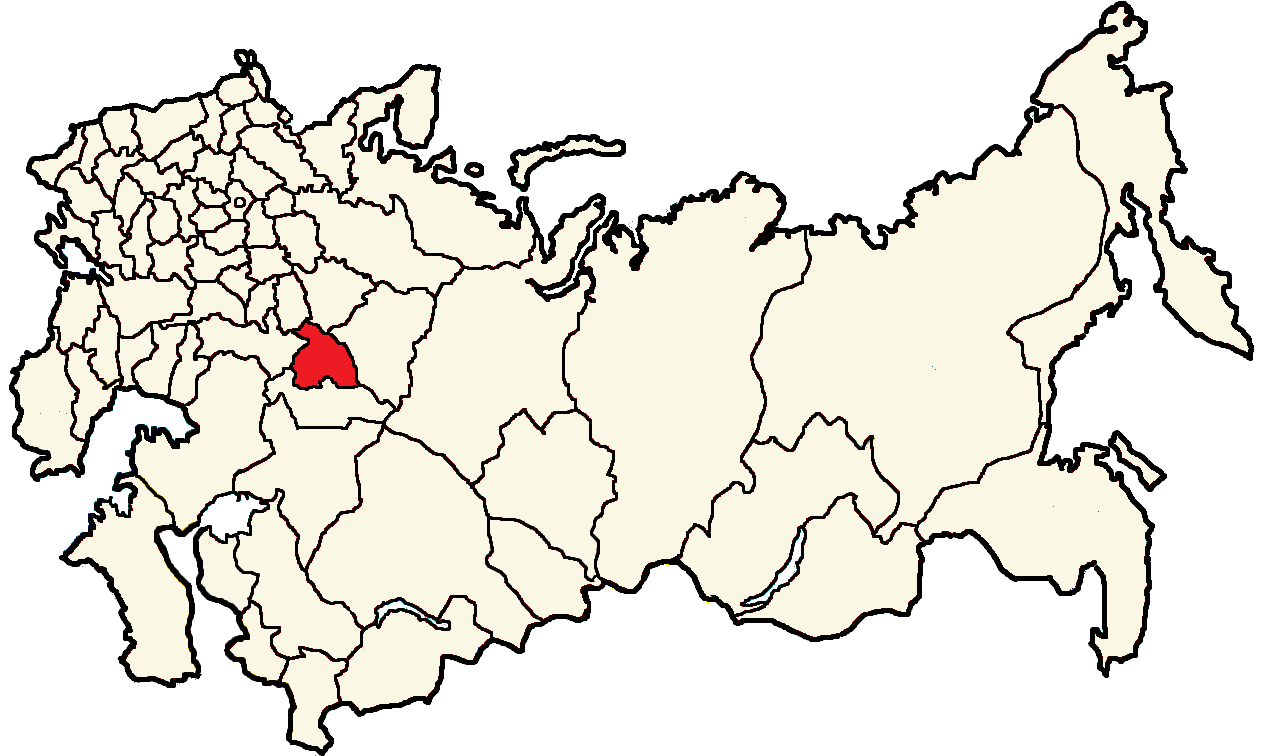

Former constituency
- Created: 1917
- Abolished: 1918
- Number of members: 13
- Number of Uyezd Electoral Commissions: 6
- Number of Urban Electoral Commissions: 2
- Number of Parishes: 198

The Ufa electoral district (Russian: Уфимский избирательный округ) was a constituency created for the 1917 Russian Constituent Assembly election.

The electoral district covered the Ufa Governorate. Ufa was a multinational constituency. List 1, the 'Federalists-Bashkirs' (fielded by the Ufa Governorate Secretariat of the Bashkir Central Council), was headed by Ahmet-Zaki Ahmetšachovič Validov. The SR list was dominated by leftist elements.

In the Ust-Katav volost (hosting the Ust-Katav Wagon-Building Plant), out of 5,062 votes cast, 4,222 votes went to the Bolshevik list and 750 to the SR list. In the Zlatoust uezd, the Bashkir Federalist list obtained 58.2% of the vote, in the Sterlitamak uezd they obtained 50.8% of the vote.

== Results ==
Ufa
Party	Vote	%	Seats
List 9 - Socialist-Revolutionaries	322,166	33.68	5
List 3 - Muslims (Social-Revolutionaries)	304,864	31.88	5
List 11 - Bashkir Federalists	135,977	14.22	2
List 1 - Muslim National Council	88,850	9.29	1
List 10 - Bolsheviks	48,151	5.03	
List 12 - Kadets	15,825	1.65	
List 6 - Orthodox Parishes	11,178	1.17	
List 8 - Popular Socialists	11,429	1.19	
List 2 - Landowners	7,358	0.77	
List 4 - Cooperative	4,941	0.52	
List 7 - Unity	3,078	0.32	
List 5 - Mensheviks	2,614	0.27	
Total:	956,431		13

Deputies Elected
Teregulov	Muslim National Council
Kuvatov	Bashkir Federalist
Validov	Bashkir Federalist
Akhmerov	Council of Peasants' Deputies
Ibragimov	Council of Peasants' Deputies
Ilyasov	Council of Peasants' Deputies
Mukhametdinov	Council of Peasants' Deputies
Syuncheley	Council of Peasants' Deputies
Brillantov	SR
Filatov	SR
Osintsev	SR
Steinberg	SR
Trutovsky	SR
