= Isaac Steinberg =

Russian anarchist (1888–1957)

- Исаак Штейнберг
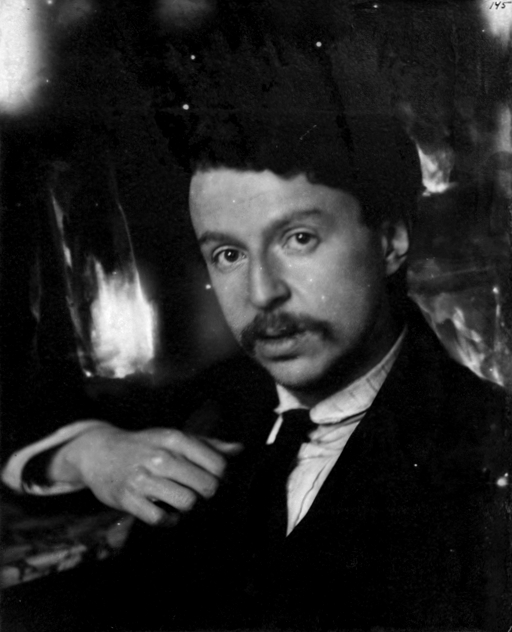
- Steinberg c. 1923

People's Commissar for Justice of the Russian SFSR
- In office 22 December 1917 – 18 March 1918
- Premier: Vladimir Lenin
- Preceded by: Pēteris Stučka
- Succeeded by: Pēteris Stučka

Member of the Russian Constituent Assembly
- In office 25 November 1917 – 20 January 1918 (Note: The Constituent Assembly was declared dissolved by the Bolshevik-Left SR Soviet government, rendering the end the term served.)
- Preceded by: Constituency established
- Succeeded by: Constituency abolished
- Constituency: Ufa

Personal details
- Born: Isaac Nachman Steinberg; 13 July 1888 Daugavpils, Russian Empire
- Died: 2 January 1957 (aged 68) New York City, United States
- Party: Socialist Revolutionary Party, Left Socialist-Revolutionaries
- Occupation: Lawyer

Isaac Nachman Steinberg (Russian: Исаак Нахман Штейнберг; 13 July 1888 – 2 January 1957) was a lawyer, a Left Socialist-Revolutionary, politician, People's Commissar under Lenin, and a leader of the Jewish Territorialist movement and writer in Soviet Russia and in exile.

== Biography ==
=== Early life and first exile ===
Steinberg was born in Dvinsk, Russian Empire (today Daugavpils, Latvia), into a family of Orthodox Jewish merchants. He was raised in a traditional religious home. In 1906, Steinberg entered Moscow University, where he studied law. He joined the Socialist Revolutionary Party (also known as SRs). He was arrested in 1908 and sent to Tobolsk province for 2 years. After exile he left for Germany and studied at the University of Heidelberg, graduating with a master's degree.

=== Return to Russia, political career and second exile ===
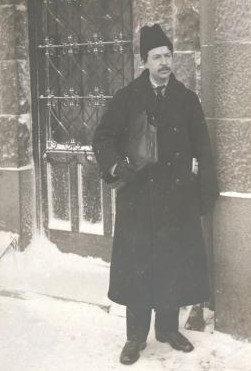
Steinberg during his time as Commissar for Justice, 1918

In 1910, Steinberg returned to Russia and worked as a lawyer. During the First World War, he conducted anti-war and revolutionary work, was arrested in 1915 and exiled to the Ufa Governorate. He continued his work as a lawyer in Ufa, where he led the Left Socialist Revolutionaries of the Ufa province. He was elected a delegate of the City Duma, was a member of the executive committee of the Ufa Council of Workers and Soldiers and the All-Russian Council of Peasant Deputies; participant in the All-Russian Democratic Conference; Member of the Provisional Council of the Russian Republic. Steinberg condemned the uprising in Petrograd, but became part of the Ufa Provincial Commissar of Agriculture nonetheless. He was elected to the Russian Constituent Assembly on the list of Socialist Revolutionaries from the Ufa province. He soon after became a member of the Left SR central committee.

From December 10, 1917, to March 1918, he was People's Commissar (Narkom) of Justice in Vladimir Lenin's government during the Bolsheviks' short-lived coalition with the left wing of the SRs. On December 18, 1917, some members of the Constituent Assembly were arrested by Felix Dzerzhinsky, but Steinberg released them. On December 19, 1917, he signed an “Instruction” to the Revolutionary Tribunal on the termination of systematic repressions against individuals, institutions and the press and sent a corresponding telegram to the Soviets at all levels. From December 1917 - January 1918, the Council of People's Commissars examined Steinberg's claims against the Cheka several times. On December 31, 1917, the Sovnarkom, on his initiative, decided to delimit the functions of the Cheka under the Petrograd Soviet.

After the scandal caused by the murder of Andrei Ivanovich Shingarev and Fyodor Kokoshkin on the night of January 6–7, 1918, the Council of People's Commissars, after hearing the report of Steinberg, instructed the NKJ to “as soon as possible verify the thoroughness of the detention of political prisoners ... all those who cannot be charged within 48 hours should be released”.

According to the decision of the Soviet government, Steinberg determined the amounts that the prisoners in Kresty had to pay as a deposit before being released, as the prison doctor Ivan Manukhin testified:

“The Left SR was then the Commissioner of Justice I.Z. Steinberg. A soft, sympathetic person, he, as a representative of the new government, was bound by a decree of the Bolshevik majority and, according to this decree, demanded that every prisoner pay a certain amount for his bail. The amount of the contribution varied depending on the commissioner's idea of the degree of “bourgeois” that the person was. I had to bargain. Relatives of the next prisoner were usually in the waiting room and immediately paid the amount that they managed to bargain for. [...] Having received a document on release from Steinberg, I usually led the prisoner out of the Crosses myself. [...] and I told everyone the same thing: “Immediately leave Petrograd.” Of my patients at Kresty, one V. L. Burtsev flatly refused to leave my prison on bail. His courage of the old revolutionary, whom does not fear prison in the least, and his devotion to revolutionary activity, which he had devoted his whole life to, apparently shamed the new rulers, and I managed to get him released without bail”

On January 11, at his suggestion, the Sovnarkom decided to investigate the activities of the People's Commissariat, the Bolsheviks Pyotr Krasikov and Mechislav Kozlovsky were accused by Steinberg of illegal activities. During a meeting of the Council of People's Commissars in February, Lenin presented the draft of a decree, "The Socialist Fatherland in Danger!". In it, there was a clause calling for the execution "on the spot" of a loose category of criminals defined as "enemy agents, speculators, burglars, hooligans, counter-revolutionary agitators, [and] German agents". Steinberg expressed objection because a "cruel threat ... with far reaching terroristic potentialities." He stated "Lenin resented my opposition in the name of revolutionary justice. So I called out in exasperation, "Then why do we bother with a Commissariat for Justice? Let's call it frankly the 'Commissariat for Social Extermination' and be done with it!" Lenin's face suddenly brightened and he replied, "Well put ... that's exactly what it should be ... but we can't say that".

On February 18, 1918, he released Vladimir Burtsev from prison. In March–April 1918, Steinberg confronted Felix Dzerzhinsky.

In the spring of 1918 he saved Prince George Lvov, who was about to be executed by the Ural Bolsheviks under Filipp Goloshchekin, with Steinberg ordering Lvov's release along with two other prisoners under a written undertaking not to leave Yekaterinburg.

On March 15, 1918, he resigned his post and left the SNK in protest against the Treaty of Brest-Litovsk. On March 19, as part of the southern delegation of the Left SR Central Committee, he went to Kursk to organize partisan detachments. From there he went to the south of the country, visited Kharkov, Rostov-on-Don, and took part in the All-Ukrainian Congress of Soviets in Yekaterinoslav. Steinberg was elected to the All-Ukrainian Central Committee of the Left Socialist-Revolutionaries. Together with Boris Kamkov and Vladimir Karelin, he became the organizer of the Main Military Headquarters of the Left SRs in Taganrog. In the spring of 1918, he actively participated in the Second Congress of the Left SRs. He delivered a speech approving the withdrawal of the Left Socialist-Revolutionaries from the SNK and warned of the danger of the Soviet bureaucracy. He was arrested by the Cheka on February 10, 1919, and spent four and a half months in custody.

In 1923, having been warned that he was in danger of assassination, Steinberg again moved to Germany and took his young family to live with him in Berlin. Here he joined the International Working Union of Socialist Parties (Vienna International), after which the All-Russian Central Executive Committee deprived him of Soviet citizenship.

=== Freeland League ===
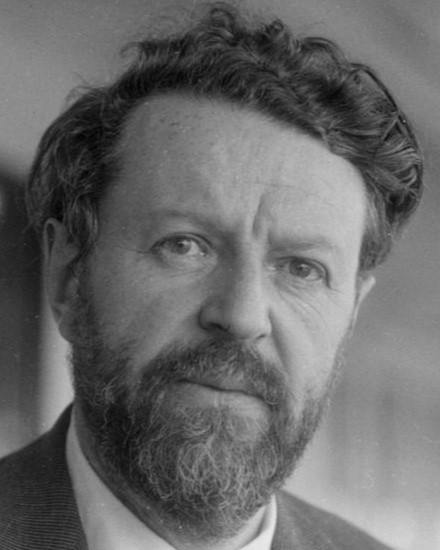
Steinberg in Australia in 1939

After the Nazis came to power in 1933, Steinberg, his wife and three children settled in London. There, he was one of the co-founders of the Freeland League, which attempted to find a safe haven for European Jews fleeing the Holocaust.

The League selected the Kimberley region of Western Australia as a place to purchase agricultural land where 75,000 Jewish refugees from Europe could be resettled. This effort became known as the Kimberley Plan, or Kimberley Scheme. Steinberg based his campaign on the officially declared need to populate northern Australia. On 23 May 1939 he arrived in Perth and by early 1940 gained substantial public support, but also encountered opposition.

Steinberg left Australia in June 1943 to rejoin his family in Canada. On 15 July 1944 he was informed by the Australian Prime Minister John Curtin that the Australian government would not "depart from the long-established policy in regard to alien settlement in Australia" and could not "entertain the proposal for a group settlement of the exclusive type contemplated by the Freeland League".

Steinberg continued his efforts in spite of setbacks. In 1946, the Freeland League started negotiations with the Surinamese and Netherlands governments about the possible resettlement of 30,000 Jewish displaced persons from Europe in the Saramacca District of Surinam. A delegation of the League headed by Steinberg, accompanied by Henri B. van Leeuwen and N. Fruchtbaum, visited Surinam in April 1947. In August 1948, the Surinamese parliament decided 'to suspend the discussions until the complete clarification of the international situation'. The negotiations were never resumed.

Steinberg was a prolific Yiddish writer, editor and prominent cultural activist, who played an important role in the development of the Yiddishist movement. Steinberg was an Orthodox Jew; it is rumored that during his short tenure as Commissar of Justice he refused to work on Sabbath, much to Lenin's dismay.

Isaac Steinberg died in New York in 1957. His son was the distinguished art historian Leo Steinberg.

== Political views ==
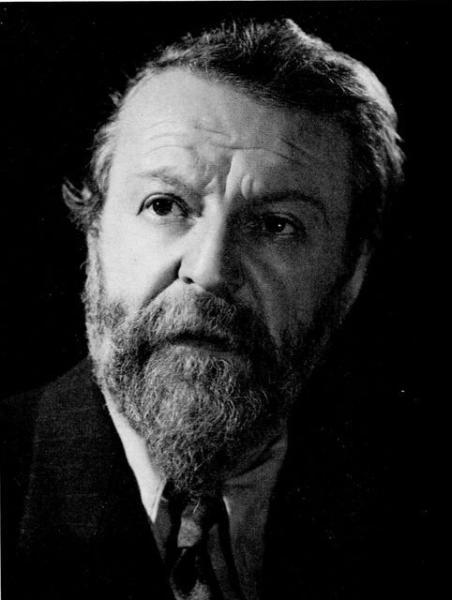
Steinberg c. 1950

Some have said Steinberg’s political views were “essentially anarchist”, although he defined himself as a Left-Social Revolutionary (Left-SR) or Left Narodnik. Russian Left Socialist-Revolutionaries proposed a radically decentralized federation of worker syndicates, councils and cooperatives whose delegates are chosen by direct democracy and could be revoked at any moment.

Unlike many anarchists, Steinberg believed that it is possible and necessary to form a political party, whose task would be the destruction of the state from within. He also noted, like some contemporary anarchists, that even an established syndicalist federation would not be completely free of elements or "crystals" of organized power. According to Steinberg, even a relatively free and stateless social system has to acknowledge the existence of some reminiscent government-like structures within itself, in order to decentralize or dismantle them and further "anarchize" the society. Steinberg viewed anarchism as an underlying principle, spirit, and drive of revolutionary socialism, rather than as a concrete political program with an ultimate goal. Therefore, he refrained from equating his ideas with "anarchism", because such an equation, in his view, would have compromised the very subtle and perpetual nature of anarchist principles.

Steinberg was a leader of the Jewish Territorialist movement. He worked hard to establish a Jewish self-managed territory, but did not support the idea of the Jewish nation-state and was highly critical of Zionist movement politics. After the establishment of the State of Israel, he supported the idea of creating a binational federation in Israel/Palestine and, at the same time, continued his efforts to establish a compact self-ruled Jewish settlement somewhere outside the Middle East.

== Works ==
- (in Russian) "Нравственный лик революции" ("Moral Face of the Revolution"), Berlin, 1923
- (in Yiddish) זכרונות פֿון אַ פֿאָלקס־קאָמיסאַר ("Memoirs of People's Commissar"), Warsau, 1931
- (in German) Gewalt und Terror in der Revolution. (Oktoberrevolution oder Bolschewismus), Berlin 1931 (2nd edition Berlin 1974, 3rd edition Bremen 2024, with new German subtitle: Das Schicksal der Erniedrigten und Beleidigten in der russischen Revolution)
- "Spiridonova: Revolutionary Terrorist". Translated and edited by Gwenda David and Eric Mosbacher. London, 1935
- (in Yiddish) געלעבט און געחלומט אין אויסטראַליע ("Lived and dreamed in Australia"), Melbourne, 1943
- Australia: The Unpromised Land (London, 1948)
- (in Yiddish) מיט אײן פֿוס אין אַמעריקע: פּערזאָנען, געשעענישן און אידעען ("With one foot in America: People, Events and Ideas"), Mexico, 1951
- (in Yiddish) אין קאַמף פֿאַר מענטש און ייִד ("In Struggle for Man and Jew"), Buenos Aires, 1952
- In the Workshop of the Revolution, New York, 1953

== See also ==
- Anarchism
- Jewish Anarchism
- Left Socialist-Revolutionaries
- Russian Revolution of 1917
