= Eiserne Division =

Baltic-German anti-communist military formation

- Flag of the Eiserne Division
- Active: 29 November 1918–early 1920
- Country: Germany
- Branch: Freikorps in the Baltic
- Type: Freikorps
- Size: 14,000 men (summer 1919); 16,000 men (peak strength)
- Part of: VI Reserve Corps (1919); West Russian Volunteer Army (1919)
- Motto: "Und doch" ("and yet")
- Engagements: Russian Civil War: Latvian War of Independence; Battle of Riga; Estonian War of Independence; Battle of Cēsis; Lithuanian–Bermontian War: Battle of Radviliškis

The Eiserne Division ("Iron Division") was a German anti-communist volunteer military formation that took part in the Latvian War of Independence in 1919. It was the best-known Freikorps formation in the Baltic. The unit was deployed against Soviet Russian puppet-state of Latvian SSR, and later defected to the West Russian Volunteer Army and fought against the Latvian Army. The division, which at times numbered up to 16,000 men, was disbanded at the beginning of 1920 due to mutiny.

== Eiserne Brigade ==
In the aftermath of World War I, the war-weary troops of the German 8th Army withdrew from the eastern Baltic States due to the invading Red Army. In order to protect the removal of troops and material, the so-called Eiserne Brigade ("Iron Brigade") was recruited from November 29 from soldiers of the army. This was decided at a joint meeting of the Reich Plenipotentiary August Winnig, the Army Commander Hugo von Kathen and the Central Soldiers' Council. Around 600 volunteers signed up, but some of them later refused to serve at the front.

The defence of Riga by the Baltische Landeswehr, a volunteer force consisting of mostly Baltic Germans, and the Iron Brigade, failed. On January 3, a Soviet government moved into Riga (see Latvian Socialist Soviet Republic). The Bolshevik armies, which included the Red Latvian Riflemen, conquered almost all of Latvia by mid-January 1919, and it was feared that a Soviet advance on East Prussia would trigger a Communist revolution in Germany. To prevent this, the Council of the People's Deputies authorised the recruitment of volunteers and Freikorps in Germany. For the time being, however, the weak front troops found themselves crowded together in a small area around Liepāja and had supply problems because Red soldiers' councils in the rear blocked the railway for the border guards.

== Eiserne Division ==
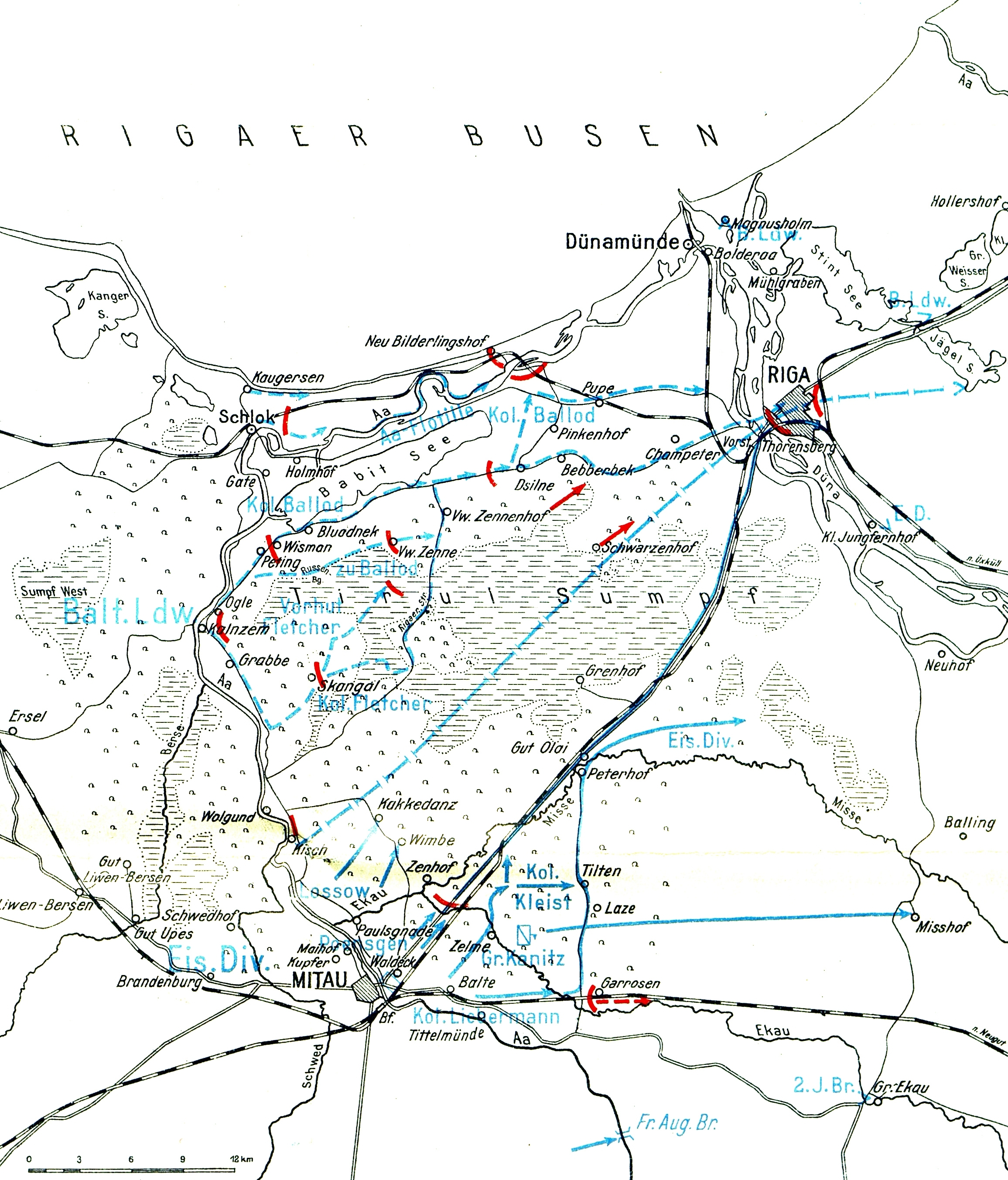
Campaigns in Latvia in 1919.

On January 16, command of the Iron Brigade passed from Colonel Friedrich Kumme to Major Josef Bischoff. The latter forbade any further marches back, sent unreliable units home and renamed the remaining 300 men the "Iron Division". With the arrival of reinforcements and new battle tactics, the front at Venta actually held. Bolshevik problems on other fronts also contributed to this.

In early February 1919, the VI Reserve Corps took over command in Courland. The commanding general, Major General Rüdiger von der Goltz, was in charge of the Libau Governorate, the Baltische Landeswehr, the Iron Division, the incoming 1st Guards Reserve Division and various smaller Freikorps. The Iron Division took part in the offensive on Jelgava at the beginning of March and occupied the old World War I position near Olaine. On May 22, Riga was recaptured together with the Baltische Landeswehr, with the Iron Division distinguishing itself through its brutality. As a result, the Red Armies initially gave up the battle for Latvia.

In June 1919, the division was deployed in the conflict between the Latvian Niedra puppet government on the one hand and the Republic of Estonia and the Latvian Ulmanis government on the other. As German troops were ordered by the Reich government and the Entente powers not to carry out any further offensive movements, five battalions and three batteries were deployed for 14 days in Niedra-Latvian service. However, they were decisively defeated at the Battle of Cēsis. Some of the troops refused to serve because they had only been recruited to fight against the Bolsheviks. After the subsequent evacuation of Riga and the armistice of Strasdenhof, the division found itself back in the Olaine section.

== Composition ==
By taking over closed volunteer corps and individual volunteers, the division reached a supply strength of around 14,000 men by the summer of 1919. There were three infantry regiments and an artillery regiment as well as cavalry and supply troops. The volunteers signed a contract for one month each, received a Baltic supplement to their pay and had the prospect of Latvian citizenship; they were also promised settlement land, albeit without authorisation. In addition to those willing to settle, idealists, professional soldiers who could not be accommodated in the Reichswehr, adventurers, the unemployed, but also all kinds of dubious elements, including criminals, who wanted to evade the criminal justice system in the Reich. Around half of the incoming replacements were sent back because they were deemed ‘morally’ unsuitable. Units often had to be disbanded due to unreliability. Politically unpopular officers and men were also deported. The division thus became a rallying point for reactionary, monarchist and nationalist forces.

The fighting was merciless on both sides and at the expense of the civilian population. Prisoners were shot and robbed in violation of orders. The marauding in the hinterland could never be stopped. After the conquest of Riga, the riots in the area of the Iron Division caused an international sensation. Special company courts had to be set up due to the many assaults and overloading of the field gendarmerie (German military police).

Although the evacuation of the Baltic states officially began in July, the division continued to strengthen itself and maintained illegal recruitment centres in Germany for this purpose.

Contrary to official German policy, the aim of the circles around Bischoff was to work with the Russian White Armies to disempower the Bolsheviks and gain influence over a future Russia. At the very least, the division was to be preserved for as long as possible in order to participate in a reactionary upheaval in Germany if necessary.

== Flag and motto ==
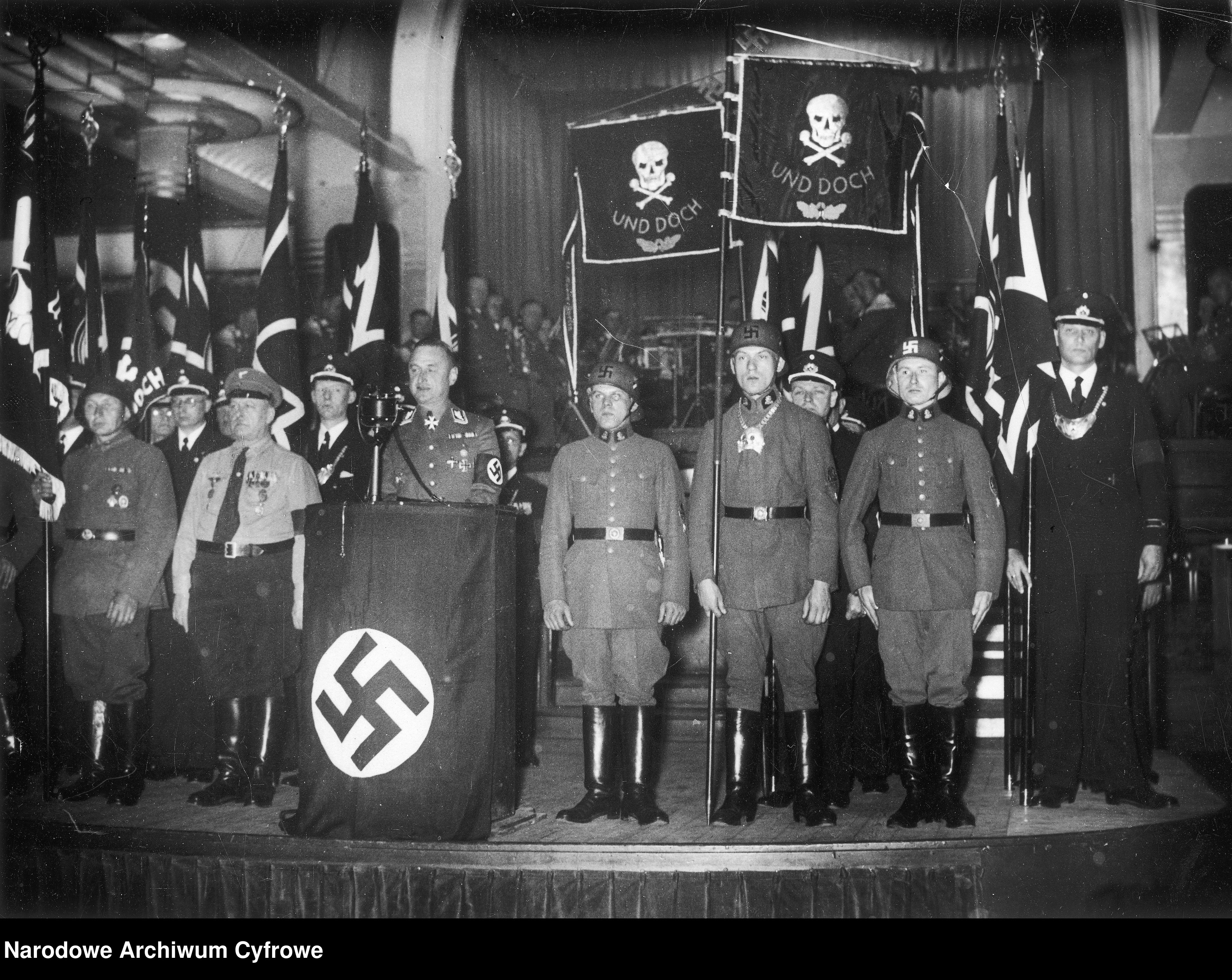
SA-Oberführer Horst von Petersdorff, former leader of his own Free Corps unit, at a Nazi propaganda event in Berlin in May 1938 commemorating the "Eiserne Division," which recaptured Riga, Latvia, on May 22, 1919. The photo shows the division’s uniforms with swastikas on the steel helmets and banners adorned with Totenkopf skull and the motto Und doch. Photo: Narodowe Archiwum Cyfrowe

Like many other Freikorps in the period after the First World War, the Iron Division used black as the basic colour of its flag. It featured a white skull and crossbones with the slogan ‘und doch’ (‘and yet’) beneath it. This motto was a reaction to the behaviour of the German government during the so-called Baltenputsch ("Baltic coup") of 16 April 1919 — a coup by Baron Hans von Manteuffel-Szoege with the Baltische Landeswehr, which resulted in the formation of a pro-German government — as a result of which the Iron Division was ordered to withdraw. The Iron Division saw this behaviour as a betrayal of the Baltic Germans. This gave rise to the story of the indomitable defiance and iron will of the Baltic German people, who were the ‘last Germans ever’ and found symbolic expression in the slogan ‘and yet’.

== Transfer to the West Russian Liberation Army ==
When the first transports of the division were ready for shipment to Germany on 23 August 1919, Bischoff decided on his own responsibility to refuse orders and stopped further transport. At the end of September, the division, together with the Free Corps of the German Legion, joined the West Russian Liberation Army of the adventurer Pavel Bermondt-Avalov. During their advance, the division reached the western suburbs of Riga without being able to conquer the city. When the Entente powers intervened in favour of Latvia and the German border was closed to supplies, the Bermondt army, which consisted of 80 % German Freikorps, collapsed. The division was forced to retreat. In mid-December, the last units crossed the German border at Memel.

== Dissolution ==
The remaining Freikorps men felt betrayed by their own government. However, the expected march on Berlin did not materialise due to a lack of political leadership. The volunteers were given immunity from prosecution, but had no opportunity to be accepted into the Reichswehr or to find jobs in industry. After demobilisation, many members of the division remained together as agricultural worker communities on estates in Pomerania.

Although most of the division had already been disbanded by the time of the Kapp Putsch, many former members were involved in the putsch. Former members of the division were later also involved in the Free Corps battles in the Ruhr area (Ruhr uprising) and Upper Silesia (uprisings in Upper Silesia).

The ideology of the "Drang nach Osten" ('Drive to the East') and the anti-Bolshevism of the Free Corps was one of the roots of National Socialism. The former Baltic soldiers of the Freikorps were a destabilising factor during the Weimar Republic and a large proportion of them joined the Hitler movement.

== Known members of the division ==
Heinz Guderian (April to August as Second General Staff Officer), Kurt Andersen, Rudolf Berthold, Waldemar Hartmann, Paul Hofmann, Bruno Loerzer, Kurt Kaul, Erwin Kraus, Richard Manderbach, Günther Pancke and Bernhard Ruberg.

== Division structure 1919 ==
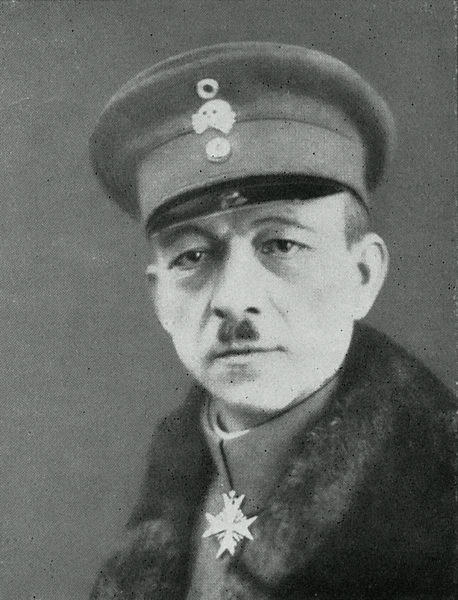
Major Josef Bischoff

The following structure was used:

- Commander: Major Josef Bischoff
- First General Staff Officer: Hauptmann Biese

Early March 1919

- "Doin" Battalion
  - "Mitau" Company
  - "Lüneburg" Company
  - MG Company
  - "Drachenfels" Jagdkommando (from the Baltic Army)
  - "Nolde" Jagdkommando (from the Baltic Army)
  - "von Besser" Jagdkommando
  - "Volkmar" Pioneers-Company
  - "Gädicke" field artillery platoon
- "Heiberg" detachment
  - "von Petersdorff" MG detachment
  - "Oberleutnant Büchner" Jäger Battalion
  - "Schleswig-Holstein" Company
  - "Schönfeldt" Company (from Graf Kanitz Battalion)
  - "Kischke" Field Artillery Platoon
- "Erich Balla" Battalion
  - "Belitz" Company
  - "Clodius" Company (from Graf Kanitz Battalion)
  - "Trapp" Field Artillery Platoon
- "von Borcke" Battalion
  - 1st Platoon
  - 2nd Platoon
  - MG Company
- "Liebermann" detachment
  - 1st Platoon
  - MG Company
  - Pioneers detachment
  - "Schilling" field artillery platoon
- "Graf Kanitz" Battalion (Volunteer Battalion 7)
  - Field Artillery Platoon
- "Preetzmann" Cavalry detachment
- "427" Aviation detachment (without Fick Squadron)
- Further divisional units

End of May 1919

- 1st Infantry Regiment (Major von Lossow)
  - I. Battalion
  - II. Battalion (Groeben)
  - III. Battalion (Heiberg)
- 2nd Infantry Regiment (Major von Kleist)
  - I. Battalion (Liebermann)
  - II. Battalion (Balla)
  - III. Battalion (Henke)
- 3rd Courland Infantry Regiment (Hauptmann Poensgen)
  - I. Battalion
  - II. Battalion
  - III. Battalion (Rieckhoff)
  - "von Petersdorff" MG detachment
  - Jäger Battalion
- Cavalry Regiment (Major Graf von Kanitz)
- Artillery detachment (Major Sixt von Armin)
  - I. Battery (Hauptmann Auerbach)
  - II. Battery (Hauptmann Zimmermann)
  - III. Battery
  - Volunteer Foot Artillery Battery of the I Army Corps (assigned)
- "427" Aviation detachment
- Armored car division of the Gov. Libau (assigned)
- Further divisional units

== See also ==
- Freikorps in the Baltic
- Baltische Landeswehr
- Freikorps
- Rüdiger von der Goltz
- Baltic Germans

== Film ==
- Die letzte Front – Defenders of Riga

== Literature ==
- Erich Balla: Landsknechte wurden wir... Tradition, Berlin 1932.
- Josef Bischoff: Die letzte Front 1919. Geschichte der Eisernen Division im Baltikum 1919. Buch und Tiefdruck Gesellschaft, Berlin 1935.
- Rüdiger von der Goltz: Meine Sendung in Finnland und im Baltikum. Koehler, Leipzig 1920, (Deutsche Denkwürdigkeiten).(online)
- Gustav Noske: Von Kiel bis Kapp. Zur Geschichte der deutschen Revolution. Verlag für Politik und Wirtschaft, Berlin 1920.
- M. Peniķis: Latvijas atbrīvošanas kaŗa vēsture. 4 Bände. Austrālijas latviešu balva Jaunsargiem, Riga 2006, ISBN 9984-19-951-7.
- Bernhard Sauer: Mythos eines ewigen Soldatentums, Der Feldzug deutscher Freikorps im Baltikum im Jahre 1919 (pdf, 7,4 Mbyte) In: Zeitschrift für Geschichtswissenschaft (ZfG), 43. Jahrgang 1995, Heft 10, 1995, Heft 10, S. 869–902
- Hagen Schulze: Freikorps und Republik. 1918–1920. Boldt, Boppard 1969, (Wehrwissenschaftliche Forschungen – Abteilung Militärgeschichtliche Studien 8, ZDB-ID 1173304-4).
- Jobst Knigge: Kontinuität deutscher Kriegsziele im Baltikum. Deutsche Baltikum-Politik 1918/19 und das Kontinuitätsproblem, Verlag Dr. Kovac Hamburg 2003, ISBN 3-8300-1036-2.
