= Kaugurciems =

Neighbourhood of Jurmala, Latvia

Coordinates: 56°58′N 23°37′E

Battle of Kaugurciems
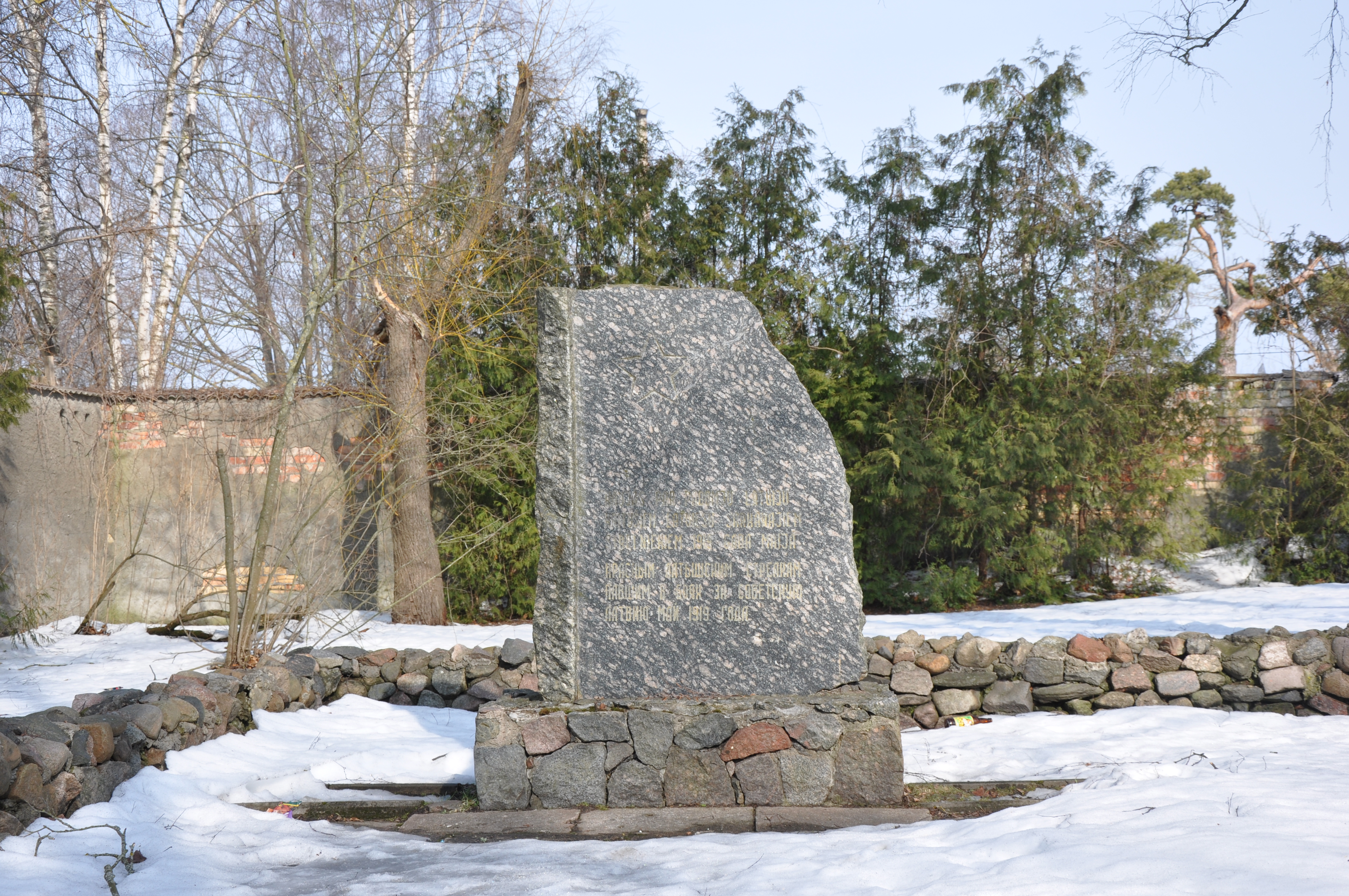
- Monument to the Red Latvian Rifleman in Kaugurciems.

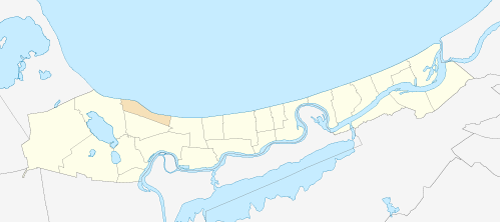
- Location in Jūrmala
- Country: Latvia
- City: Jūrmala
- Established: November 6-8, 1919

Area
  - Total: 2.1 km^{2} (0.81 sq mi)
- Elevation: 3 m (9.8 ft)

Population (2008)
  - Total: 1,000
  - Density: 476.2/km^{2} (1,233/sq mi)

Kaugurciems is a residential area and neighbourhood of the city Jūrmala, Latvia.

== History ==
During Latvian War of Independence Latvian army followed Germans in their advance towards Riga. On 22 May 1919 Germans captured Riga and thus Latvian Socialist Soviet Republic suffered a major defeat. But Latvian Riflemen on their way toward Riga met fellow Latvians in the battlefield of Kaugurciems. Red Latvian rifleman were defeated in the battle and retreated from Vidzeme into Latgalia.
