= White Terror =

White Terror may refer to:

== Events ==
=== France ===
- First White Terror (1794–1795), a movement against the Jacobins in the French Revolution
- Second White Terror (1815), a movement against the French Revolution

=== Post-Russian Empire ===
- White Terror (Russia), political violence by anti-Bolshevik forces during the Russian Civil War (1918–1922) and related conflicts
- White Terror (Finland), the repression committed by the White Finns both during and after the Finnish Civil War in 1918
- White Terror (Latvia), the repression committed by the White side in the Latvian War of Independence 1918-1920
- White Terror (Estonia), the repression committed by the White side in the Estonian War of Independence 1918-1919

=== Republic of China ===
- White Terror (China), the period of political repression in mainland China started in 1927 by the Republic of China/Kuomintang government with the Shanghai massacre.
- White Terror (Taiwan), political repression in Taiwan during 1949 – 1987 by the Republic of China/Kuomintang government

=== Other ===
- White Terror (Hungary), a two-year period (1919–1921) of repressive violence by counter-revolutionary soldiers
- White Terror (Bulgaria), the repression of the communist September Uprising in the Kingdom of Bulgaria (1923)
- White Terror (Spain), mass murders committed by the Nationalist movement during the Spanish Civil War and Francisco Franco's rule (1936–1945)
- White Terror (Greece), the persecution of the EAM-ELAS between the signing of the Treaty of Varkiza in February 1945 and the beginning of the Greek Civil War in March 1946

== Titles ==
- The White Terror (film), a 1917 silent German thriller film; the title refers to an Arctic expedition
- Kenya: White Terror, a 2002 BBC documentary based on the work of Caroline Elkins
- The White Terror (story), a thriller story by Arthur Wright

== See also ==
- Red Terror (disambiguation)
- White (political adjective)
