= People's Commissariat of Justice of the Russian Soviet Federative Socialist Republic =

Russian SFSR government agency

The People's Commissariat of Justice of the Russian Soviet Federative Socialist Republic was an executive body within the Soviet government of Russia (Council of People's Commissars) in charge of the organization and functioning of the justice system.

== History ==
The People's Commissariat of Justice was established by the Decree Establishing the Council of People's Commissars, passed by the Second All–Russian Congress of Soviets of Workers', Soldiers' and Peasants' Deputies on October 27, 1917.

In 1917, the People's Commissariat of Justice was entrusted with the immediate breakdown of the entire apparatus of the former Ministry of Justice and the Court of the Russian Empire. The People's Commissariat of Justice was entrusted with the responsibility of building a new legal system and a new justice system, as well as replacing the abolished Governing Senate in terms of judicial control on a nationwide scale.

At the same time, the duties of the State Council of the Russian Empire, its Special Department and the Senate for the preparation and publication of decrees and for the codification of laws passed to the People's Commissariat of Justice.

In the Soviet Union, in accordance with the Constitution until 1936, only the republican People's Commissariats of Justice operated: the People's Commissariat of Justice of the Russian Socialist Federative Soviet Republic and the People's Commissariats of Justice of the Union and Autonomous Republics supervised the judicial practice of all judicial bodies of this republic, challenging and directing the supervision through the prosecutor's office wrong sentence or decision made by any court on the territory of the republic. In the organizational field, the People's Commissariats of Justice of the Union and Autonomous Republics were entrusted with: general management, organization, audit, and instruction of all judicial institutions of the republic, notaries, bailiffs, defense, organized under the People's Commissariats of Justice, bureaus of accounting expertise and educational institutions under the jurisdiction of the People's Commissariats of Justice of the union republics. Supervision of judicial policy in specific cases was carried out by the supreme courts of the union republics, regional, regional courts of ownership and the prosecutor's office.

According to the Constitution of the Soviet Union of 1936, the Union–Republican People's Commissariat of Justice of the Soviet Union was created. Thus, the People's Commissariat of Justice of the Russian Soviet Federative Socialist Republic and the People's Commissariats of Justice of other union republics, being part of the republican Councils of People's Commissars, at the same time had to carry out the orders of the unified central union People's Commissariat of Justice of the Soviet Union.

In 1946, the People's Commissariat of Justice of the Russian Soviet Federative Socialist Republic was transformed into the Ministry of Justice of the Russian Soviet Federative Socialist Republic.

== Functions of the People's Commissariat ==
The People's Commissariat of Justice was entrusted with the following tasks:

1. Organization and instructing the bodies of the court, investigation, defense (advocacy) and prosecution (prosecutor's office), as well as monitoring the activities of the commission on juvenile affairs;
2. Consideration, in the order of the highest judicial review, court decisions and sentences that have entered into legal force, the provision of guidance and instructions to the judicial authorities and supervision of legality (the People's Commissar is simultaneously the Prosecutor of the Republic);
3. Preliminary consideration of bills, publication, and interpretation of laws;
4. Development of general penalties, organization of a corrective labor regime for persons deprived of their liberty both by court verdicts and by way of a preliminary investigation, as well as managing places of deprivation of liberty;
5. Leading and supervising the implementation of the separation of the church from the state (a liquidation department was created in the People's Commissariat that was engaged in the destruction of the Russian Orthodox Church).

== Execution of punishments ==
On April 15, 1919, the decree "On Forced Labor Camps" was issued in the Russian Socialist Federative Soviet Republic. From the very beginning of the existence of Soviet power, the management of most places of detention was entrusted to the department for the execution of punishments of the People's Commissariat of Justice of the Russian Socialist Federative Soviet Republic, formed in May 1918.

== Heads of the People's Commissariat ==
On November 8, 1917, Georgy Oppokov was appointed People's Commissar of Justice, he was replaced by Pyotr Stuchka, then Isaac Steinberg.

On June 16, 1918, Pyotr Stuchka was appointed People's Commissar of Justice.

In August 1918, after the departure of Peter Stuchka (who headed the Soviet government of Latvia from the end of 1918), Dmitry Kursky was appointed People's Commissar of Justice, who held this post until 1928.

The next People's Commissar was Nikolai Yanson, who was replaced in 1931 by Nikolay Krylenko, who held the post until July 1936.

The People's Commissar of Justice of the Russian Socialist Federative Soviet Republic was at the same time the Prosecutor of the Russian Socialist Federative Soviet Republic. The Supreme Court of the Russian Socialist Federative Soviet Republic, like the prosecutor's office, was part of the apparatus of the People's Commissariat of Justice, and the chairman of the Supreme Court was simultaneously the Deputy People's Commissar of Justice. This management model coincided with the pre-Soviet model and existed until 1936.

== Structure of the People's Commissariat ==
Structure in 1917. The operational meeting, the secretariat, and the group of responsible executors were directly subordinate to the People's Commissar. The People's Commissariat included:

- Management of Affairs;
- Personnel Training Department;
- Legislative and Codification Department;
- Financial Department;
- Special Department;
- Secret Encryption Part.

In total, the staff was 150 people. The Supreme Court of the Russian Socialist Federative Soviet Republic and the Prosecutor's Office of the Russian Socialist Federative Soviet Republic were formally part of the People's Commissariat of Justice of the Russian Socialist Federative Soviet Republic as structural units.

Structure in 1939. The Control and Inspection Group, the Secretariat, and the Operational Meeting were directly subordinate to the People's Commissar. The People's Commissariat included:

- Management of Affairs;
- Office of the Judiciary;
- Management of Educational Institutions;
- Human Resources Management;
- Department of the Bar;
- Department of Notaries;
- Department of Codification of Legislation;
- Financial Department;
- Mobilization Department;
- Secret Encryption Part;

In total, the staff was 168 people.

Structure in 1940. The Control and Inspection Group, the Secretariat, the Collegium, and the meeting of deputies were directly subordinate to the People's Commissar. The People's Commissariat included:

- Management of Affairs;
- Office of Judicial Institutions;
- Management of Educational Institutions;
- Human Resources Management;
- Department of the Bar;
- Department of Notaries;
- Codification Department;
- Planning and Finance Department;
- Mobilization Department;
- Secret Encryption Department.

In total, the staff was 195 people.

Structure in 1942. Moscow. The Secretariat and the Collegium were directly subordinate to the People's Commissar. The People's Commissariat included:

- Management of Affairs;
- Department of Judicial Institutions (Partially);
- Human Resources Management;
- Department of the Bar;
- Codification Department;
- Financial Department (Part);
- Mobilization Department;
- Secret Encryption Department.

Sol–Iletsk. Deputy People's Commissar of Justice. Operational meeting. The People's Commissariat included:

- Department of Judicial Institutions (Part);
- Department of Notaries;
- Financial Department (Part).

The staff was 95 people.

Structure in 1944. The Secretariat and the Collegium were directly subordinate to the People's Commissar. The People's Commissariat included:

- Management of Affairs;
- Office of Judicial Institutions;
- Management of Educational Institutions;
- Human Resources Management;
- Department of the Bar;
- Department of Notaries;
- Codification Department;
- Financial Department;
- Mobilization Department;
- Secret Encryption Department.

In total, the staff was 123 people.
