= Fricis Roziņš =

Latvian journalist (1870–1919)

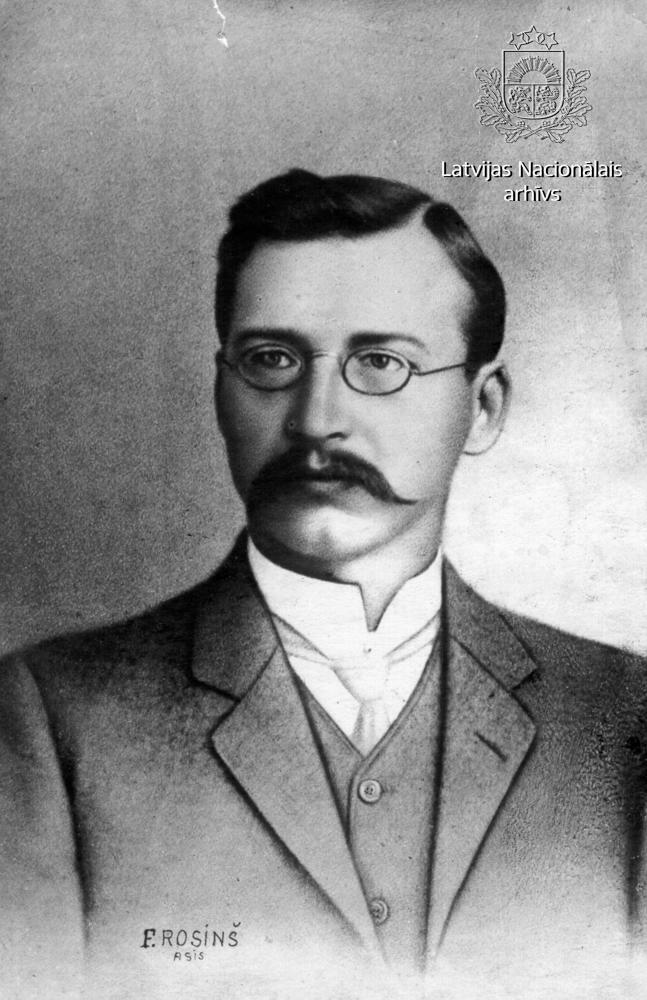
- Born: 19 March 1870; Purmsātu Parish, Courland Governorate, Russian Empire
- Died: 7 May 1919 (aged 49); Lūznava Parish, Latvian Socialist Soviet Republic
- Education: University of Tērbatas
- Occupations: Publicist, journalist, essayist, columnist, translator, revolutionary
- Political party: RSDLP; LSDSP

Fricis Roziņš, also known as Fricis Roziņš-Āzis (19 March 1870 – 7 May 1919) was a Latvian Marxist revolutionary, publicist, essayist, columnist and one of the founders of the Communist Party of Latvia.

== Biography ==
Frīdrihs (Fricis) Roziņš, was born on 19 March 1870 in the family of Ādam Roziņš, owner of the "Vanagu" house in Purmsātu Parish. He studied at the elementary school in Durbe, then at the Nikolajas gymnasium in Liepāja. In 1891, he began studying medicine at the University of Tērbatas. In 1894 he was expelled for revolutionary activities. In the spring of 1894, he published an article in the newspaper Dienas Lapa "Are general singing holidays national holidays?".

In 1896, Roziņš resumed his studies at the law faculty, but in the summer of 1897 he was arrested due to the accusation of belonging to the New Current movement. In September of the same year, he was released from Liepāja prison and ordered to stay at his father's house in "Bušupos" of Tāšu Padure parish.

In June 1899, Roziņš moved to London and became a professional revolutionary. He participated in the founding of the Union of Latvian Social Democrats of Western Europe, published the magazine "Latviešu Strādnieks" (1899), later the magazine "Sociāldemokrats" (1900-1905) and the pamphlet series "Social Democrat Library". In the magazines he managed, he printed articles on Marxist philosophy, etc., as well as literary works and poems, which were sent to Russia and Latvia as illegal literature through the port of Liepāja. During this time, Roziņš's historical reflection "Latvian Peasant" and the translation of Marx and Engels' The Communist Manifesto were written. In July 1902, the editorial staff of "Social Democrat" moved to Switzerland with Rožina at its head. In 1904, he was elected to the Social Democracy of the Latvian Territory the Central Committee and he participated in the 5th Congress of the Russian Social Democratic Workers' Party.

During the revolution of 1905, he returned to Latvia, where he published satirical "Latvian Workers' Calendars", which he signed under the pseudonym "Āzis", among the readers they were known as "Āža calendars". In 1908, he was arrested and sent to a Siberian penal colony for four years. In 1912, Roziņa was imprisoned in the Irkutsk Governorate, from where he escaped to the USA in 1913 and was the editor of the newspaper "Strādnieks".

After the February Revolution, he returned to Latvia in 1917 and was elected a deputy of the Russian Constituent Assembly, in January 1918 he became the chairman of the Executive Committee (Iskolat) of the Council of Latvian Workers, Soldiers and Landless Deputies. After Iskolat was disbanded in March 1918, Roziņš worked in the People's Commissariat of National Affairs of the Russian Communist Party in Moscow, then returned to Riga, where he was commissar of agriculture in the government of the Latvian Socialist Soviet Republic.

Fricis Roziņš died in Luznava, Rēzekne district, on 7 May 1919, of pulmonary tuberculosis and was buried in Riga's Brothers' Cemetery.
