= Revolutionary tribunal (Russia) =

Soviet Judiciary System

Revolutionary tribunals (commonly abbreviated as revtribunals, Russian: революционные трибуналы) in Soviet Russia were established soon after the October Revolution by the Soviet "Decree of the Soviet of Peoples' Commissars Concerning the Courts No. 1" ("Декрет о суде № 1") of November 22 (N.S.: December 5), 1917.

== History ==
The 1917 decree proclaimed that the workers' and peasants' revolutionary tribunals were established "for the purpose of the struggle against counter-revolutionary forces and defend the revolution, as well as to struggle against marauders, and profiteers, sabotage and other abuses by merchants, industrialists, clerks and others". The term was borrowed from the Revolutionary Tribunal of the French Revolution. The first trial was that of Provisional Government functionary Sofia Panina.

When the Cheka (Extraordinary Commission) was established in the next month, its functions included handing accused persons over to revtribunals.

On September 2, 1918, on the basis of a resolution of the All-Russian Central Executive Committee, the Revolutionary Military Council of the Republic was established, which on October 14, 1918, issued order No. 94, clause 11 of which read: “To form a Military-Revolutionary Tribunal under the Revolutionary Military Council of the Republic". The Chairman of the Tribunal was Julius Daniševskis and members Konstantin Mekhonoshin and Semyon Aralov.

Later the "Statute of Revolutionary Tribunals" of April 12, 1919, established the precedence of revtribunals over people's courts and gave them unrestricted rights to set the measure of prosecution. On October 21, 1919, the Special Revolutionary Tribunal was established within the Cheka to consider "grave cases of profiteering, bribery and abuse of office (должностные преступления)". As the decree said, "in its considerations, the Special Revolutionary Tribunal follows the interests of the revolution and is not bound by and forms of legal proceedings."

== See also ==
- Revolutionary Tribunal
