= Iskolat =

Pro-Soviet Latvian government body

- 1917–1918
- Flag
- Motto: Workers of the world, unite!
- Anthem: The Internationale
- Status: Autonomy
- Capital: Cēsis; Valka (later)
- Common languages: Latvian; Russian; Latgalian
- Chairman of Iskolat
  - 1917: Oto Kārkliņš
  - 1918: Fricis Roziņš
- History
  - Founded: 30 July 1917
  - Second Congress: 22 December
  - Part of Soviet Russia: 31 December
  - Treaty of Brest-Litovsk: 3 March 1918
Preceded by	Succeeded by
Governorate of Livonia; Courland Governorate	Latvian Socialist Soviet Republic
- Today part of: Latvia

Iskolat (Russian: Исколат, Latvian: Iskolats), or formally the Executive Committee of the Soviet of Workers, Soldiers, and the Landless in Latvia, (Note: (Исполнительный комитет Совета рабочих, солдатских и безземельных депутатов Латвии)) was the governing body in the territory of Latvia that was under control of the pro-Communist Red Latvian Riflemen in 1917–1918.

== History ==
During the Russian Revolution the Iskolat was established in Riga on 29–30 July 1917 O.S. (August 11 – 12, 1917, N.S.), at the initiative of the Central Committee of the Social Democratic Party, then controlled by the Bolsheviks with the purpose of carrying out the Bolshevik coup within the territory of Latvia not occupied by Germany. When Germans occupied Riga, the Iskolat moved to Cēsis and later to Valka, where it took power over the Valka district, disbanding the organs established by the Russian Provisional Government.

On December 17, 1917 the Congress of Soviets of Latvia convened in Valmiera and elected Oto Kārkliņš as the chairman of Iskolat, who was later replaced by Fricis Roziņš in 1918.

Iskolat fled to Moscow after German forces occupied Latvia in February 1918 and was disbanded in March 1918.

Soviet historiography considers the Iskolat to have been the first Soviet government of sovereign Latvia between December 1917 and February 1918.

== See also ==
- Latvian Provisional National Council
- Latvian Socialist Soviet Republic
