= White (political adjective) =

White or White- (белый, бело-), was a political term used as an adjective, noun or a prefix by Bolsheviks to designate their real and alleged enemies of all sorts, by analogy with the White Army and White movement.

- White-Guardist ("белогвардеец"): a member of the "White Guard". The members of the White movement never applied the term "White Guardist" to themselves. Also, White-Guardists were called simply "Whites" ('белые', 'беляки') by their opponents.
- White émigré (белоэмигрант): any citizen of the Tsarist Russian Empire who left the country during the Russian Revolution or the Russian Civil War (1917-1922). White emigrants were perceived as a threat to the Soviet state, a source of espionage and counter-revolutionary plots.
- White Poles (белополяки): a term that appeared during the Polish–Soviet War, and later reemerged during the annexation of a part of Poland in World War II.
- White-Finn (белофинн): a term introduced during the unsuccessful attempt to initiate a revolution in Finland in 1917-1918, and reintroduced as part of the propaganda related to the preparation of the Winter War against Finland. the term continued to be in the subsequent use, e.g., in the context of the East Karelian uprising. Later used for the White Guard.
- White-Chinese (белокитаец): a term denoting Chinese forces that fought together with the White Army in Siberia and the Russian Far East, as well as anti-communist Chinese (such as the Kuomintang) during the Chinese Civil War.
- White-Czechs (белочехи): members of the Czechoslovak Legion.
- White-Cossacks (белоказаки): cossack military that fought against the Bolsheviks during the Civil War.
- White-Esers (белоэсеры): the supporters of the anti-Bolshevik Eser party (as opposed to Left Socialist-Revolutionaries, which split by the end of 1917 and sided with Bolsheviks during the Civil War). The term was widely used in, though not limited to, Siberia, where they led the regionalist Provisional Siberian government, and were known as 'right Esers' or simply 'the Esers' elsewhere.

These terms were supposed to distinguish, e.g., "good Poles" from "bad Poles", and usually bore a derogatory gist.

== See also ==
- White Terror (disambiguation)
- White International
- White Revolution
- Whites (Montenegro)
- International Secretariat of Democratic Parties of Christian Inspiration
