= Latvian Provisional National Council =

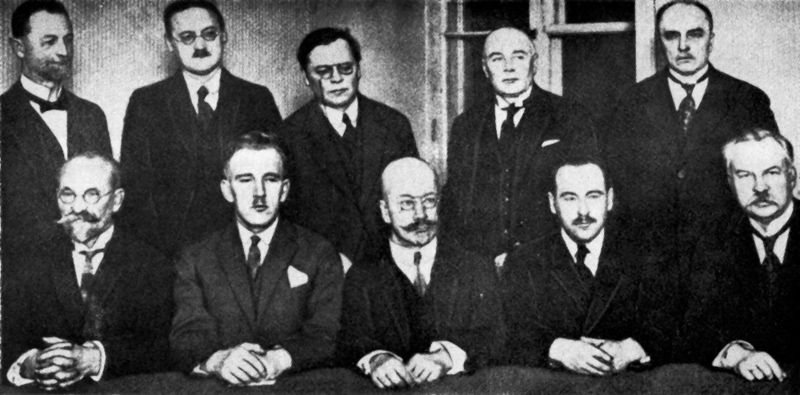
The LPNP Board. Sitting from left to right: Kristaps Bahmanis (secretary), Jānis Rubulis (vice-chairman), Voldemārs Zāmuēls (chairman), Jānis Palcmanis (vice-chairman), Kārlis Pauļuks (vice-chairman). Standing: Vilis Siliņš, Oto Nonācs, Kārlis Skalbe, Jānis Akuraters, Eduards Laursons.

Latvian Provisional National Council (Latvian: Latviešu pagaidu nacionālā padome, LPNP) was a political organization established on November 29, 1917 (November 16 in the Julian calendar) in Valka, Governorate of Livonia by the Latvian Refugee Support Central Committee, Latvian political parties and representatives from the Provisional Land Council of Vidzeme and the Provisional Land Council of Latgale. Due to German army advances, the National Council also met in Petrograd, in secrecy from the new Bolshevik regime.

== Creation ==
On October 14–17, 1917, Latvian organizations and politicians met in Petrograd and agreed to create a Council that would include 3 representatives from Vidzeme, 3 from Latgale, 3 from Kurzeme, 2 from the Refugee Support Central Committee, 1 from the Baltic Refugee Organization, 2 from Iskolat, 2 from the Soldiers' Union, 1 from the Latvian Farmers' Union, 1 from left-wing parties and 1 from right-wing of the Latvian Social Democrats, as well as 1 from Eser, Radical Democrat and National Democrat parties each, thus making sure that all Latvian political factions were represented. At this point no representatives from Baltic German, Jewish, Russian or Polish minorities were included.

== The first session ==
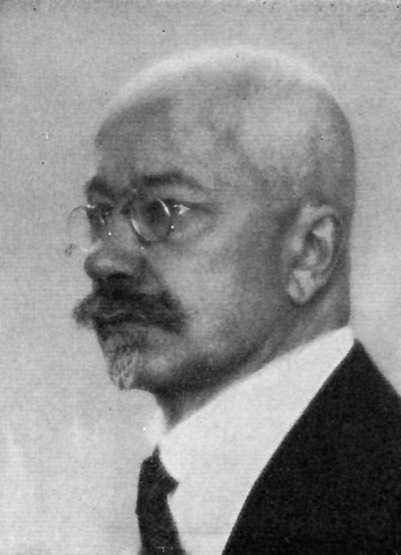
Voldemārs Zāmuēls, the first leader of the LPNP

The first session met between November 29 and December 2, 1917 (November 16–19 Old Style) in Valka. Bolshevik controlled parties and left-wing Social Democrats decided to abstain from participation. The First session is attended by representatives from Vidzeme, Latgale and Courland land councils, Latvian soldier national union, Latgalian soldiers, Latvian refugee support Central committee, Baltic refugee support committee, Latgalian refugee support committee, Latvian Farmers' Union, Latvian National Democratic Party, Latvian Democrat Party, Latvian Radical Party and Latvian Cooperative Congress. Left-wing Vidzeme land council representatives and Social Democratic Menshevik faction participated as observers only.

Some delegates wanted to proclaim independence right away, but it was opposed by Farmers' Union delegates. The compromise decision was made that the exact status of the Latvian state shall be decided by a future Constitutional Assembly.

On November 19 delegates sent three congratulatory telegrams - to the Ukrainian Central Rada, the Nationalities' Congress in Kyiv and the Parliament of Finland.

More importantly, on November 19 session National Council adopted two resolutions. The first one was addressed to the "Russian revolutionary democracy" and proclaimed the unification of all Latvian-inhabited lands. This meant that Latgale is to be united with the Latvian-inhabited lands of Governorate of Livonia and Courland Governorate. The second one was addressed to "foreign countries and nations" proclaiming Latvia's autonomy. "Latvia, which includes Vidzeme, Kurzeme and Latgale is an autonomous state unit, its internal and external system will be decided by its Constitutional Assembly and a popular plebiscite."

National Council established 7 departments:

1. Foreign affairs department
2. Defense and rebuilding department
3. Constitutional Assembly election commission
4. Finances department
5. Commission for creating Constitution
6. Agrarian department
7. Culture and book department.

Voldemārs Zāmuēls was elected chairman of National Council with Kārlis Pauļuks, J. Rubulis and J. Palcmanis as co-chairs.

On December 19, 1917 (Old Style), January 1, 1918, the Bolshevik dominated Iskolat, which was also located in Valka, moved to ban the National Council, and it relocated to Petrograd.

== The second session ==
Between January 15–18 (Old Style), 28-31, 1918 (New Style), the National Council met in Petrograd. It was opened by the Council Chairman Voldemārs Zāmuēls. Arveds Bergs, Zigfrīds Anna Meierovics and Jāzeps Rancāns were then elected to chair the proceedings in rotating order.

Representatives of nine parties and organizations participated in the session: representatives of Vidzeme Land council, Latgale Land council, Kurzeme Land council, Refugee support Central committee, National Soldiers Union, Latvian Farmers' Union, Radical Democratic Party, National Democratic Party, Latvian Democratic Party. Representatives of five professional organizations and ethnic Latvian farming colonies from Russia participated as observers.

One of the more important reports was delivered by the Foreign Affairs Committee which had established contact with foreign embassies. Sweden had expressed indifference to Latvian independence, while France had expressed support for it. The ongoing German-Bolshevik Treaty of Brest-Litovsk negotiations mean the worst-case scenario of annexation and cultural dominance. The only future lies with the Western Allies.

Meierovics said: "We have to stand our line and demand Latvian independence. We have to review our relationship with Germans. We have to protest against the division of Latvia and ignoring its interests. However, the immediate proclaiming of the Latvian state is unwise. A state needs territory, people and power. But we lack the power. Bolsheviks advocate further unity of Latvia with Russia. If we were to declare independence, we would have to organize administrative organs, to create ministries, which Bolsheviks would surely arrest. We see how hard it is for Finns and Ukrainians. But we don't even have that power which they have."

On January 30 (New Style), 1918 National Council with 23 votes against 1 adopted a proclamation in which it advocated the creation of an independent, democratic Latvian republic, protested against any division of ethnic Latvian lands and protested against any peace treaties that ignore rights of national self-determination.

On the last day, the situation in Latgale and Bolshevik danger to the ethnic Latvians living in Belarus was discussed.

== The third session ==
The third session met in Petrograd in smaller numbers and deep secrecy between June 26–28, 1918 after which National Council already called itself as the only legitimate representative of Latvia. It adopted resolution in which it announced that cooperation with German occupation forces should be minimal, limited to practical issues only, and that further and more active contacts with Western Allies should be pursued.

Further meetings in the Bolshevik Petrograd became impossible with the start of the Red Terror. This was tragic, as many early Cheka leaders were Latvians, and Red Latvian Riflemen served as Lenin's bodyguards. One of the Latvian Riflemen leaders Frīdrihs Briedis was accused of anti-bolshevik conspiracy and shot in August. After this, all National Council activities continued in Latvia.

On October 23, 1918 and again on November 11 United Kingdom, represented by its Foreign Minister Arthur Balfour in a meeting with Meierovics recognized de facto Latvian independence and National Council as its government.

== End of National Council ==
Despite the achievement of de facto recognition from the United Kingdom, the occupying Germany refused to recognize it and preferred to deal with the Social Democrat-dominated Democratic bloc. To resolve this impasse, the National Council and Democratic bloc united in a new Tautas padome (People's Council).

With the proclamation of Latvian independence on November 18, 1918 by Tautas padome, the National Council relinquished its authority to Tautas padome and its representatives joined it.

== Latvian Independence date controversy ==
Some politicians from the National Council and later historians have claimed that December 2, 1917 or January 30, 1918 declarations should really be considered the Latvian Independence declarations, instead of the much later November 18, 1918 declaration, which was a result of political compromise between the National Council and the Democratic bloc.
