= Jūlijs Daniševskis =

Latvian Bolshevik politician

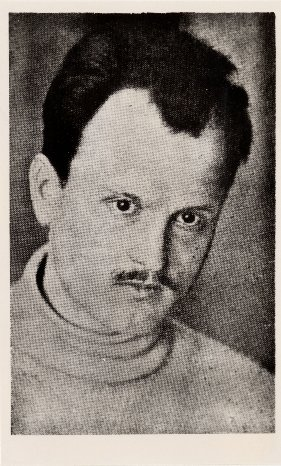
Daniševskis in 1910

Jūlijs Kārlis Daniševskis (Russian: Карл Ю́лий Христиа́нович Данише́вский, Karl Yuri Hristianovich Danishevsky; 15 May 1884, Doblen County – 8 January 1938, Kommunarka shooting ground, Moscow Oblast), alias Hermanis, was a Latvian Marxist and professional revolutionary.

== Early life ==
Daniševskis was born into a prosperous peasant family in Latvia. Having becoming involved in revolutionary circles as a teenager, he took an active part in the 1905 Revolution, after which he had to flee to Russia to escape the punitive expedition sent to reconquer Latvia for the Tsar. In June 1907, he was elected the sole Latvian representative on the Central Committee of the Russian Social Democratic Labour Party (RSDLP)). in 1907–1914, he based at different times in St Petersburg, Baku, Tiflis, Warsaw, Riga, Latvia, and Moscow. In 1914, he was sentenced to exile for life in Narym, but escaped in January 1917.

After the February Revolution, Daniševskis was a member of the Russian Bureau of the Central Committee of the Social Democracy of the Latvian Territory. In May, he returned to Latvia, where he was one of the editors of the Bolshevik newspapers "Tsinya" ("Struggle") and "Soldier's Truth" and led revolutionary agitation among the workers and Latvian riflemen. He remained in Riga when it was overrun by the German army in 1917, going underground in order to carry out agitation among the soldiers of the occupying army.

He and Jukums Vācietis created and led the Latvian Division, which played a major role in suppressing the revolt by the Left Socialist-Revolutionaries in Petrograd. Afterwards, he was appointed a member of the Revolutionary War Council on the Eastern Front at the start of the Russian Civil War. In January–May 1919, Daniševskis was the deputy leader of the Latvian Socialist Soviet Republic under Pēteris Stučka's leadership. From July 1919, he took part in planning and conducting operations against the White armies of General Yudenich, General Denikin, Admiral Kolchak and Baron Wrangel.

He was one of the organizers of the Red Terror in the Crimea. He described the role of the punitive organs of revolutionary power as the first chairman of the Revolutionary Military Tribunal of the RSFSR:

Military tribunals are not and should not be governed by any legal norms. These are punishing bodies created in the course of the most intense revolutionary struggle.

In 1920, he participated in the negotiations that ended the war with Poland.

In 1921, Daniševskis was appointed secretary of the Siberian bureau of the Russian Communist Party. In 1922, he was appointed Head of the North Timber Trust.

In 1923, he signed the Declaration of 46, which implied that he sympathised with Trotsky in the power struggle that followed Lenin's fatal illness, but he not only avoided backing the opposition, but pleaded for a meeting with Stalin so that he could explain away his actions. It was eventually granted and he declared afterwards "Stalin has forgiven me".

In 1932–1936, he was Deputy People's Commissar of the Forestry Industry of the USSR.

== Arrest and death ==
During the Great Purge, as a part of the so-called "Latvian Operation", he was arrested by the NKVD on 16 July 1937. After being convicted by the Military College of the Supreme Court of the USSR on 8 January 1938, on charges of "participation in the counterrevolutionary terrorist organisation", Daniševskis was shot on 8 January 1938, at the Kommunarka shooting ground, near Moscow. He was rehabilitated on 18 July 1956 by the Military College of the Supreme Court of the USSR.

== Personality ==
Simon Liberman, a Menshevik who worked for the North Timber Trust, wrote that:

Danishevsky was one of those communists whose job it was to accustom former tsarist army officers to the new Red Army service ... Danishevsky had to convince them that they really enjoyed all the rights and priveges promised to them when they first joined. But at the same time, he had to be constantly on guard ... and so in his relations with these men he was now affable, now ruthless.

== Family ==
His son, Sigismund Karlovich Danishevsky (April 7, 1920 -?), fought in World War II and later became a specialist in the creation and use of high-temperature thermocouples.
