= Pēteris Stučka =

Latvian and Soviet jurist and politician

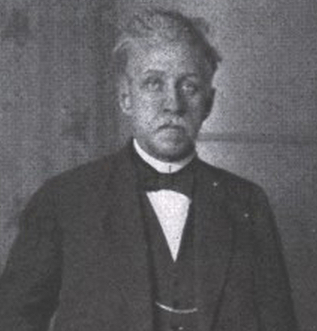
- Stučka in 1918

Chief Justice of the RSFSR
- In office January 1923 – 25 January 1932
- Premier: Vladimir Lenin (until 1924); Alexei Rykov (until 1930); Vyacheslav Molotov
- Preceded by: Position established
- Succeeded by: Ivan Lazarevic Bulat

Chairman of the Council of People's Commissars of the Latvian Socialist Soviet Republic
- In office 17 December 1918 – 13 January 1920
- Preceded by: Position established
- Succeeded by: Position dissolved

People's Commissar for Justice of the RSFSR
- In office 29 November – 22 December 1917
- Premier: Vladimir Lenin
- Preceded by: Georgy Oppokov
- Succeeded by: Isaac Steinberg
- In office 18 March – 14 September 1918
- Premier: Vladimir Lenin
- Preceded by: Isaac Steinberg
- Succeeded by: Dmitry Kursky

Personal details
- Born: 26 July [O.S. 14 July] 1865 Koknese, Livonia, Russian Empire (now Koknese, Latvia)
- Died: January 25, 1932 (aged 66) Moscow, Russian SFSR, Soviet Union
- Resting place: Kremlin Wall Necropolis, Moscow
- Party: All-Union Communist Party (bolsheviks)
- Spouse: Dora Pliekšāne
- Education: St. Petersburg University
- Profession: Lawyer

Pēteris Stučka, sometimes Russified to Pyotr Stuchka; (Note: Russian: Пётр Ива́нович Сту́чка, German: Peter Stutschka (in contemporary writings)) (26 July [O.S. 14 July] 1865 – 25 January 1932), was a Latvian jurist and communist politician, leader of the pro-Bolshevik Latvian Socialist Soviet Republic in Latvia during the 1918–1920 Latvian War of Independence, and later a statesman in the Soviet Union.

== Biography ==
Stučka was born in Latvia, in the Governorate of Livonia (then part of the Russian Empire). His father was a prosperous farmer, his mother was a teacher. He was educated in a German lyceum in Riga, and then St Petersburg University, where he studied law. After graduating in 1888, he returned to Latvia, where he practised as a lawyer, and was one of the leaders of the New Current movement in the late 19th century, a prolific writer and translator, and an editor of Latvian language newspapers and periodicals. He was arrested in 1897, and sentenced to five years exile in Vyatka province, where he was allowed to continue practising law. When the Russian Social Democratic Labour Party split into its Bolshevik and Menshevik factions, Stučka supported the Bolsheviks, who were led by Vladimir Lenin. In 1904, he was one of the organisers of the Latvian Social Democratic Workers' Party, which held its first congress clandestinely in Riga.

After the February Revolution, which overthrew the Tsar, Stučka backed Lenin's April Theses, which called for a second, Bolshevik-led revolution, and organised the detachment of Latvian riflemen who played a crucial role in the October Revolution.

Appointed People's Commissar for Justice in the first Bolshevik government, on 7 November 1917, he was responsible for abolishing all existing judicial institutions, replacing them with local courts consisting of a judge and two assessors, created by local soviets, and for decreeing that existing laws should be treated as valid only where "they are not in contradiction with the revolutionary conscience." In an article published in 1919, he also explained that the soviet imposed punishments on individuals not to exact retribution or expiate individual guilt, but as a measure of social defence against enemies of the revolution.

The result, as Stučka noted in retrospect, was that "from November 1917 to 1922, law was formally lacking."

In February 1918, Stučka returned to Latvia, where he was chairman of the government of the short-lived Latvian Socialist Soviet Republic from December 1918 to August 1919. According to the writer, Victor Serge, Stučka,

a great figure now forgotten, instituted a strictly egalitarian regime in his sovietised Latvia, in which the Party Committee was also the Government; its members were forbidden to enjoy any material privileges at all. Vodka was banned, though the comrades obtained it clandestinely from peasants, who through home distilling extracted a terrifying alcohol from corn."

After the collapse of the Latvian communist government in August 1919 after a counter-offensive by Latvian Army and allied troops, Stučka returned permanently to Russia. In 1920–32, he worked in Comintern, as a member, and was chairman of the International Control Commission in 1924–28.

In 1923, Stučka, was appointed the first Chief Justice of the Russian SFSR. He held this post until his death in 1932.

After his death on January 25, 1932, Stučka's remains were cremated and his ashes amongst those of other Communist dignitaries in the Kremlin Wall Necropolis, near Lenin's Mausoleum in Moscow's Red Square.

== Family ==
Stučka's wife, Dora Pliekšāne (1870–1950), was the sister of the Latvian poet Rainis (Jānis Pliekšāns), with whom Stučka shared a room during their law studies at St. Petersburg University. Rainis supported socialism, but stressed that national culture was also important. Although Rainis initially supported a free Latvia within a free Russia, he later supported an independent Latvian nation.

== Places and organizations named in honour of Stučka ==
- During the Soviet period, from 1958 to 1990, the University of Latvia was officially known as Pēteris Stučka Latvian State University (Latvian: Pētera Stučkas Latvijas Valsts universitāte).
- The town of Aizkraukle was named Stučka, after Pēteris Stučka, from the time when it was established in 1960s until the fall of Communism in 1991, when it was renamed Aizkraukle.
- In the GDR, Polytechnic Secondary School No. 55 (German: 55. Polytechnische Oberschule) in Rostock was named "Peter Stucka" in honour of the Latvian Communist.

== Works ==
A comprehensive bibliography of the works by and about Stučka, with explanatory material in both Latvian and Russian, is:

- Olmane, P.; Pūce, O. (1988). Pēteris Stučka: Biobibliogrāfiskais rādītājs / Петр Стучка: Биобиблиографический указатель (in Latvian and Russian). Riga: Viļa Lāča Latvijas PSR Valsts bibliotēka. OCLC 22544777.

== See also ==
- Bibliography of the Russian Revolution and Civil War
- Outline of the Russian Revolution and Civil War
- Index of articles related to the Russian Revolution and Civil War
