= Latvian Socialist Soviet Republic =

Socialist republic formed during the Latvian War of Independence (1918-20)

Latvian Socialist Soviet Republic Latvijas Sociālistiskā Padomju Republika
- 1918–1920
- Flag Coat of arms
- Motto: "Visu zemju proletārieši, savienojieties!" Workers of the world, unite!
- Anthem: Internacionāle
- Capital: Riga (to 22 May 1919); Dvinsk (Daugavpils); Rezhitsa (Rezekne)
- Common languages: Latvian · Russian; Latgalian^{a}
- Government: Soviet republic
- Chairman
  - 1918–1920: Pēteris Stučka
- Legislature: All-Latvian Congress of Workers' Soviet Deputies
- History
  - Established: 17 December 1918
  - Recognized by Russian SFSR: 22 December 1918
  - Riga captured by German Freikorps: 22 May 1919
  - Disestablished: 13 January 1920
- Currency: Ruble
Preceded by
Republic of Latvia
Baltic Duchy
Iskolat
Succeeded by
Republic of Latvia
- 1. Local languages included German, Yiddish, Lithuanian and Estonian.

The Latvian Socialist Soviet Republic (Latvian: Latvijas Sociālistiskā Padomju Republika, LSPR) was a short-lived socialist republic formed during the Latvian War of Independence. It was proclaimed on 17 December 1918 with the political, economic, and military backing of Vladimir Lenin and his Bolshevik government in the Russian SFSR. The head of government was Pēteris Stučka with Jūlijs Daniševskis as his deputy.

== History ==
The LSPR armed forces, which consisted of the Red Latvian Riflemen and other units of the Red Army, quickly captured most of the territory of present-day Latvia, forcing Kārlis Ulmanis's provisional government into a small pocket of territory around the city of Liepāja.

Stučka's government introduced sweeping communist reforms, resuming the radical policy direction from the abortive Iskolat government. Some reforms were initially popular, such as the expropriation of property from the bourgeoisie. The decision to unilaterally nationalise all agrarian land, however, had dire economic consequences for the cities, as rural support for the regime declined drastically.

The peasants no longer agreed to supply the townsfolk with foodstuffs on the government's terms, and shortages became critical. When the people in Riga and other cities began to starve, contributing to widespread discontent among the proletariat as well, a wave of Red Terror swept both rural and urban areas, seeking out alleged counter-revolutionaries supposedly responsible for the failures of the regime. Arbitrary Revolutionary Tribunals and the so-called Flintenweiber ("Gun-Women") were memorable components of this wave of terror.

When the Entente-backed Ulmanis government counter-attacked with the backing of German Freikorps units in the spring of 1919, they quickly regained the lost territory. The capital, Riga, was recaptured on 22 May 1919, and the territory of the LSPR was reduced to a part of Latgale in eastern Latvia, until the final defeat in the Battle of Daugavpils by combined Latvian and Polish forces in early 1920.

In Soviet historiography, the Soviet occupation of Latvia in 1940 was seen as reestablishing of power, and the 1920–1940 period of Independence was viewed just as a temporary break in Soviet-Latvian history.

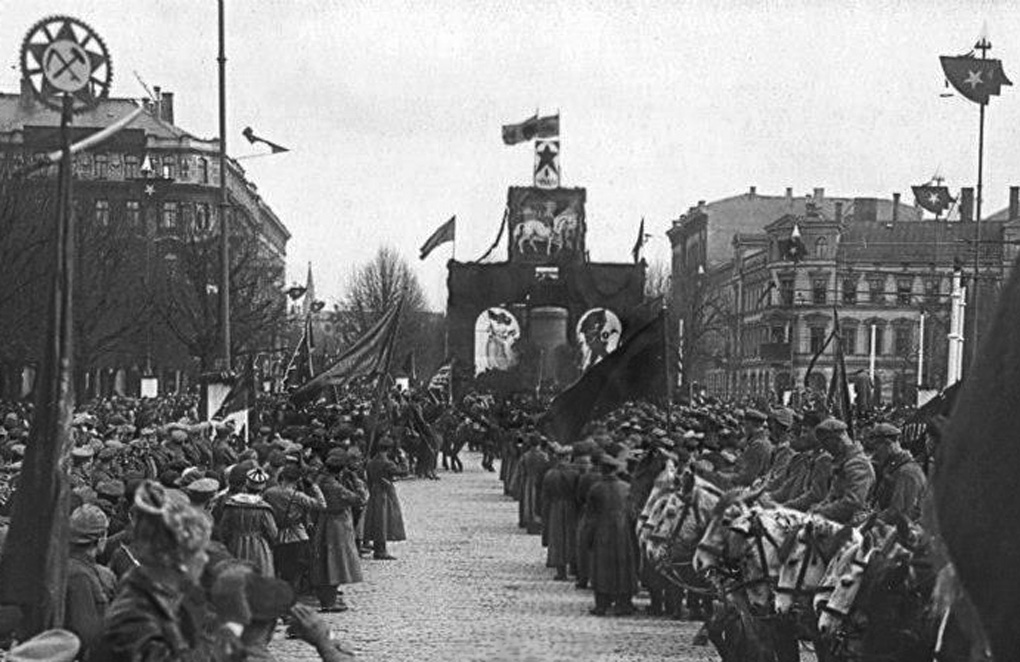
May 1, 1919 celebrations in Riga

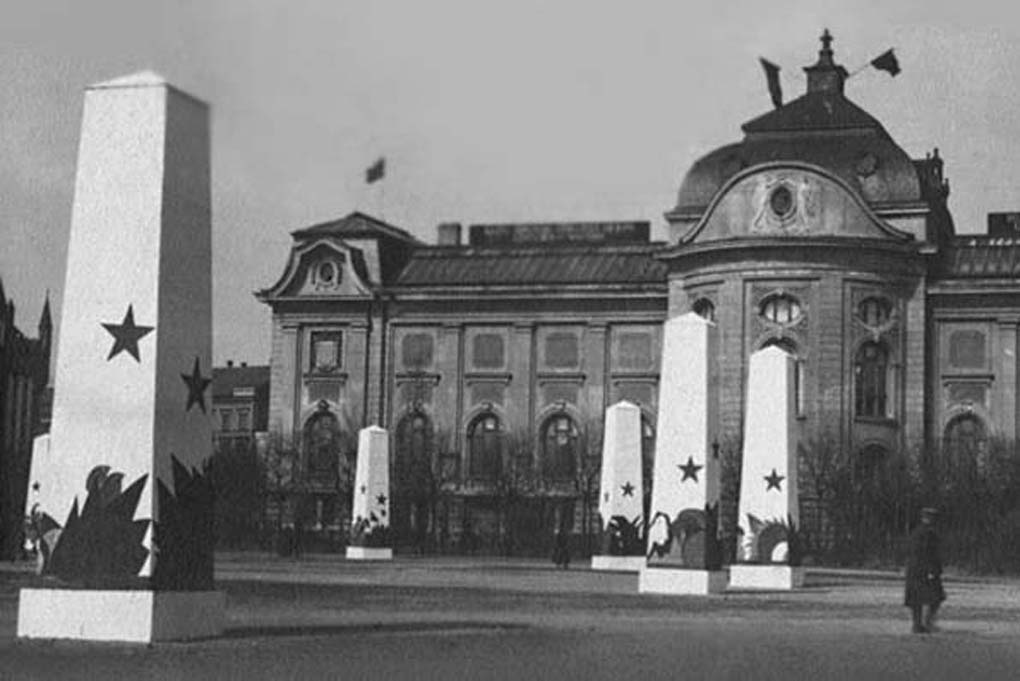
May 1, 1919 decorations in Riga

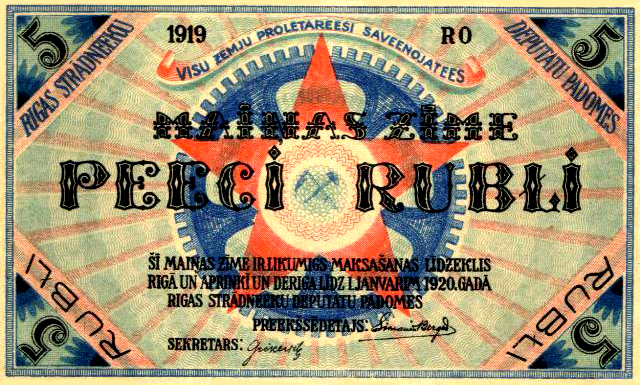
5 ruble note

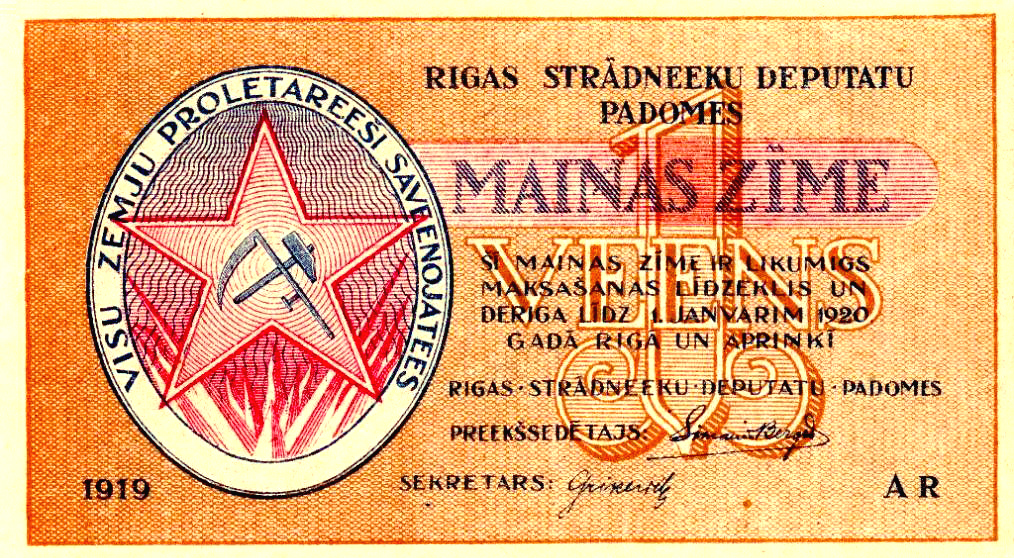
1 ruble note

== Government ==
The formation of the Soviet Latvian government was initiated by the Central Committee of the Latvian Social Democracy (LSD) in Moscow on Joseph Stalin's proposal at an extraordinary meeting of the party's Russian bureau on November 23, 1918. Special meetings were created Latvian revolutionary composition of the provisional Soviet Government.

In 1919 The 1st Joint Congress of Workers', Landless and Riflemen's Councils was held in Riga on 1 January, announcing the establishment of the Latvian Socialist Soviet Republic, the establishment of a dictatorship of the proletariat, and electing the Latvian Central Executive Committee (LCIK) with 60 members and 20 candidates. LCIK appointed 11 members of the Soviet Latvian Government or Council of Commissars:

- Chairman of the Council — Pēteris Stučka
- Deputy Chairman — Jūlijs Daniševskis, Jānis Lencmanis, Oto Kārkliņš
- People's Commissar of the Interior — Jānis Lencmanis
- Commissar of Justice — Pēteris Stučka
- Commissar of War — Kārlis Pētersons
- Commissar of Agriculture — Fricis Roziņš
- Commissar of Finance — Rūdolfs Endrups
- Commissar of Industry — Dāvids Beika (Deputy Kārlis Pečaks)
- Secretary of the Council — Jānis Šilfs (Jaunzems)
- Commissar of Construction and Public Building — Eduards Zandreiters.

In April 1919, Kārlis Ziediņš, a member of the Revolutionary War Council of the Baltic Fleet, was appointed the head of the LSPR Maritime administration. Jānis Bērziņš (Ziemelis) was the Commissar of Education and Augusts Sukuts was the Commissar of State Control.

All members of the government were also members of the LCIK presidium and the central committee of the Latvian Social Democracy (later the Communist Party of Latvia). As a result, political power in Soviet Latvia was concentrated in the hands of a narrow circle of people. Eight economic commissariats were merged into the People's Economic Council, while the war, internal affairs and justice commissariats were merged into the Revolutionary War Council.

== See also ==
- Red Terror in Latvia
- Latvian Soviet Socialist Republic
- Iskolat
- Commune of the Working People of Estonia
- Finnish Socialist Workers' Republic
- History of Latvia
- Lithuanian–Byelorussian Soviet Socialist Republic
- Republics of the Soviet Union
- Socialist Soviet Republic of Byelorussia

== Bibliography ==
- Stuchka, P. (1919–21). Piat' mesiatsev Sotsialisticheskoi sovetskoi Latvii: Sbornik statei i dokumentov (in Russian). Pskov: Izd-vo TsK KP Latvii. pp. 2 v. OCLC 38770737.
- Popoff, George (1932). The City of the Red Plague: Soviet Rule in a Baltic Town. London; New York: George Allen & Unwin; E. P. Dutton & Co. OCLC 413467.
- Krastyn', IA. P. (Krastiņš, J.) (ed.) (1959–60). Sotsialisticheskaia Sovetskaia Respublika Latvii v 1919 g. i inostrannaia interventsiia: Dokumenty i materialy (in Russian and Latvian). Riga: Izd-vo Akademii Nauk Latviiskoi SSR. pp. 2 v. OCLC 18861284.
- Zile, Zigurds L. (1977). "Legal Thought and the Formation of Law and Legal Institutions in the Socialist Soviet Republic of Latvia, 1917–1920". Journal of Baltic Studies. 8 (3): 195–204. doi:10.1080/01629777700000191.
