= Central Powers intervention in the Russian Civil War =

Military expeditions, 1918–1920

- Part of the Russian Civil War and the final operations of the Eastern Front
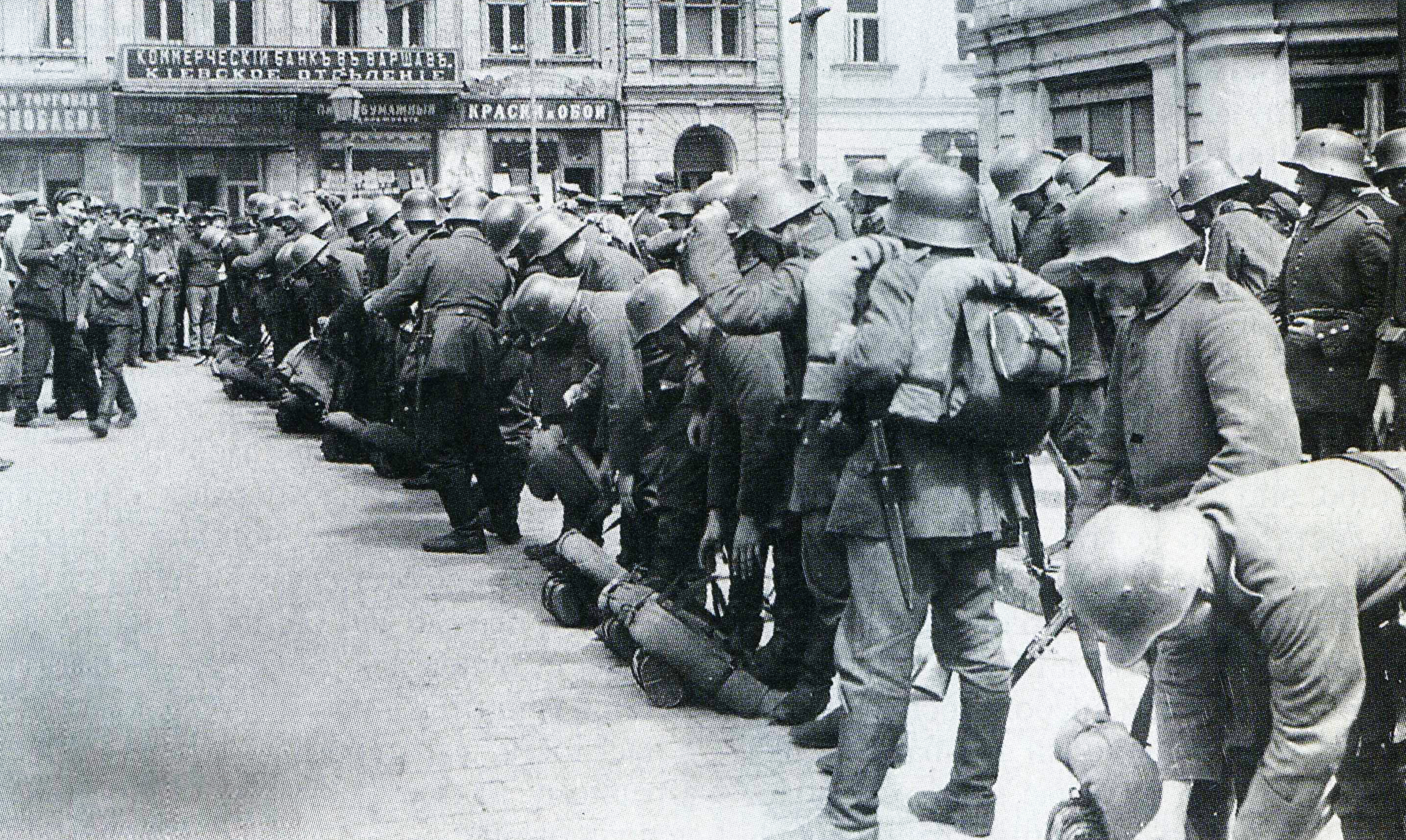
Date	15 December 1917 – 10 January 1920 (2 years, 3 weeks and 4 days)
Location	Central and Eastern Europe
Result	see § Aftermath
Territorial changes	Central Powers withdraw from occupied territories

Belligerents
Central Powers: In support of: White movement Don Republic (Belarusian Democratic Republic) Belarus German Empire (Note: 1917–1918); Finland; Georgia; Crimea; Austria-Hungary (Note: 1917–1918); Ottoman Empire (Note: 1917–1918); Azerbaijan; Ukrainian State; Landeswehr (Note: 1918–20); Freikorps (Note: 1918–19); Bermontians (Note: 1918–20)	Bolsheviks: Russian SFSR; Finnish Socialist Workers' Republic; Commune of Estonia; Lithuanian SSR; Latvia; Iskolat (Note: 1917–1918); Latvian SSR (Note: 1918–20); Ukrainian Soviet Republics: Taurida SSR (Note: 1918); Crimean SSR (Note: 1919); Odessa SR (Note: 1918); DK SR (Note: 1918); Ukrainian SR (Note: 1918); Rumcherod (Note: 1918); Baku Commune (Note: 1918); Makhnovshchina	Estonia; Latvia; Lithuania; Directorate of Ukraine (Note: 1919); Czechoslovak Legion; Supported by the Allied Powers: United Kingdom; France and others

Commanders and leaders
(German Empire) H. von Eichhorn (German Empire) Max Hoffmann	(Russian Soviet Federative Socialist Republic) Vladimir Lenin (Russian Soviet Federative Socialist Republic) Jukums Vācietis	(Estonia) Ernst Põdder (Latvia) Jānis Balodis (Lithuania) Silvestras Žukauskas

The Central Powers intervention in the Russian Civil War consisted of a series of multi-national military expeditions starting in 1918. This intervention was picking up from the Eastern Front against the newly set up Russian Republic. The main goals of the intervention were to maintain the territories received in the Treaty of Brest-Litovsk, prevent a re-establishment of the Eastern Front, and administer the newly conquered territories. After the defeat of the Central Powers, many armies that stayed mostly helped the Russian White Guard eradicate communists in the Baltics until their eventual withdrawal and defeat. In addition, pro-German factions fought against the newly independent Baltic states until their defeat by the Baltic States, backed by the victorious Allies.

== Prologue to the Central intervention ==
The Central Powers had already been fighting Russia for three years. The Russian Empire had been in a mixed situation in the early stages of the war. While losing to the German Empire they had some victories against the Austro-Hungarian and Ottoman Empires. However, by 1917 Russia was on its back foot with Germany and Austria having lost Poland, Lithuania and parts of West Belarus. Even with the entry of Romania into the war Russia could not push back. These conditions brought about the February Revolution and the creation of the Russian republic. The new republic did not fare any better and saw a continued stalemate. With the start of the Russian Civil War, the collapse of the Republic and the rise of Red Russia a vacuum on the eastern border was created. Several states broke free in the chaos which Germany decided to take advantage of.

=== Peace with the Central Powers ===
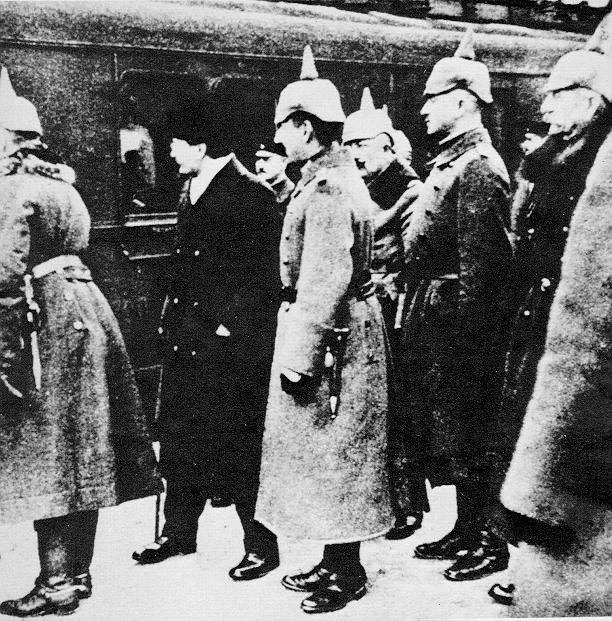
Soviet delegation with Trotsky greeted by German officers at Brest-Litovsk, 8 January 1918

The Bolsheviks decided to immediately make peace with the German Empire and the Central Powers, as they had promised the Russian people before the Revolution. Vladimir Lenin's political enemies attributed that decision to his sponsorship by the Foreign Office of Wilhelm II, German Emperor, offered to Lenin in hope that, with a revolution, Russia would withdraw from World War I. That suspicion was bolstered by the German Foreign Ministry's sponsorship of Lenin's return to Petrograd. However, after the military fiasco of the summer offensive (June 1917) by the Russian Provisional Government, and in particular after the failed summer offensive of the Provisional Government had devastated the structure of the Russian Army, it became crucial that Lenin realize the promised peace. Even before the failed summer offensive the Russian population was very skeptical about the continuation of the war. Western socialists had promptly arrived from France and from the UK to convince the Russians to continue the fight, but could not change the new pacifist mood of Russia.

On 15 December 1917 an armistice was signed between Russia and the Central Powers in Brest-Litovsk and peace talks began. As a condition for peace, the proposed treaty by the Central Powers conceded huge portions of the former Russian Empire to the German Empire and the Ottoman Empire, greatly upsetting nationalists and conservatives. Leon Trotsky, representing the Bolsheviks, refused at first to sign the treaty while continuing to observe a unilateral cease-fire, following the policy of "No war, no peace".

In view of this, on 18 February 1918 the Germans began Operation Faustschlag on the Eastern Front, encountering virtually no resistance in a campaign that lasted 11 days. Signing a formal peace treaty was the only option in the eyes of the Bolsheviks because the Russian Army was demobilized, and the newly formed Red Guard was incapable of stopping the advance. They also understood that the impending counterrevolutionary resistance was more dangerous than the concessions of the treaty, which Lenin viewed as temporary in the light of aspirations for a world revolution. The Soviets acceded to a peace treaty, and the formal agreement, the Treaty of Brest-Litovsk, was ratified on 6 March. The Soviets viewed the treaty as merely a necessary and expedient means to end the war. The German Empire created several short-lived satellite buffer states within its sphere of influence after the Treaty of Brest-Litovsk: the United Baltic Duchy, Duchy of Courland and Semigallia, Kingdom of Lithuania, Kingdom of Poland, the Belarusian People's Republic, and the Ukrainian State. Following the defeat of Germany in World War I in November 1918, these states were abolished.

Finland was the first republic that declared its independence from Russia in December 1917 and established itself in the ensuing Finnish Civil War from January–May 1918. The Second Polish Republic, Lithuania, Latvia and Estonia formed their own armies immediately after the abolition of the Brest-Litovsk Treaty and the start of the Soviet westward offensive in November 1918.

== After the Armistice ==
After the eventual downfall of the Central Powers, the armies occupying the eastern territories could not be resupplied with the new German Army reduced to nothing more than 100,000 volunteers. This withdrawal would create a large power vacuum as nations that barely declared independent found it difficult to scrape up an army to defend itself from the Soviet advance. Several units turned into unofficial German units such as the Freikorps, Baltic Landeswehr and Bermontians. The main base of operations of these new armies was in the Baltics fighting in the Lithuanian, Latvian and Estonian War of Independence with the goal of maintaining German supremacy in the region.

== Aftermath ==
=== End of the intervention ===
In late 1919 it became clear that the Baltic States were going to be independent and the Western Front was coming to a close. With the Baltic wars of Independence wrapping up the West Russian Volunteer Army was becoming obsolete. In mid-December 1919 a withdrawal was organized by Walter von Eberhardt from Lithuania to East Prussia, finally back on German soil.

== See also ==
- Allied intervention in the Russian Civil War
- List of states and regions involved in the Russian Civil War
- Bibliography of the Russian Revolution and Civil War
- Outline of the Russian Revolution and Civil War
- Planned German client states
  - United Baltic Duchy
  - Duchy of Courland and Semigallia (1918)
  - Kingdom of Lithuania (1918)
  - Kingdom of Poland (1917–1918)
