= Battle of Cēsis (1919) =

1919 battle in the Estonian War of Independence

- Part of Estonian War of Independence, Latvian War of Independence
Date	19–23 June 1919
Location	Cēsis, Latvia 57°18′47″N 25°16′29″E
Result	Estonian-Latvian victory

Belligerents
Estonia; Latvia	Baltische Landeswehr; Freikorps

Commanders and leaders
(Estonia) Ernst Põdder (Estonia) Nikolai Reek (Latvia) Jorģis Zemitāns (Latvia) Krišjānis Berķis	Rüdiger von der Goltz; Alfred Fletcher

Units involved
(Estonia) 3rd Division Including: (Estonia) Kuperjanov Battalion; (Estonia) Kalevlaste Maleva Battalion; (Estonia) 3rd Infantry Regiment; (Estonia) 6th Infantry Regiment; (Estonia) 9th Infantry Regiment; (Latvia) 2nd Latvian Cēsis Regiment	Baltische Landeswehr Iron Division

Strength
(Estonia) 6,509 infantry 65 cavalry 106 heavy machine guns 126 light machine guns 23 artillery pieces 3 armoured vehicles 3 armoured trains including (Latvia) 750 infantry 8 heavy machine guns 20 light machine guns	5,500–6,300 infantry 500–600 cavalry 50 heavy machine guns 90 light machine guns 42–48 artillery pieces

Casualties and losses
Estonia: 110 killed 295 wounded Latvia: 13–40 killed 30–85 wounded 15 missing	274 killed
- Location within Latvia

The Battle of Cēsis (Latvian: Cēsu kaujas; Estonian: Võnnu lahing, Battle of Võnnu; German: Schlacht von Wenden, Battle of Wenden), fought near Cēsis (Wenden) in June 1919, was a decisive battle in the Estonian War of Independence and the Latvian War of Independence. After heavy fighting, an Estonian force moving from the north, supplemented by Latvian units, repelled Baltic German attacks and went on a full counter-attack.

== Background ==
Latvia had declared independence in 1918, but was unable to stop the advance of the Red Army, resulting in the loss of Riga. The advance of the Red Latvian Riflemen was stopped by the German VI Reserve Corps. The Reserve Corps under general Rüdiger von der Goltz consisted of the Baltische Landeswehr, the Freikorps Iron Division, and the Guard Reserve Division. The Latvian volunteers loyal to the Provisional Government were also placed under the command of the Baltische Landeswehr. On 16 April 1919, the Latvian government of Kārlis Ulmanis was toppled by the Germans, who installed a puppet German Provisional Government of Latvia headed by Andrievs Niedra. However, the Latvian Brigade led by Jānis Balodis remained passively under the German command.

After recapturing Riga from the Red Army, the VI Reserve Corps continued its advance north. At the same time, the 3rd Estonian Division, having pushed the Soviets out of south Estonia, was advancing into Latvia from the north. Estonia continued to recognise the Ulmanis government, and neither side was ready to back down. On 5 June, fighting started, with the Landeswehr capturing Cēsis the following day. On 10 June with the mediation of the Allies a ceasefire was declared, but talks failed, and on 19 June fighting recommenced.

== Battle ==
Military control in Latvia on 22 June 1919 pro-German forces Russian Red Army (Bolsheviks) Latvian army Estonian army

On 19 June, fighting resumed with an Iron Division attack on the Estonian positions near Limbaži. At that time, the 3rd Estonian Division, including the 2nd Latvian Cēsis Regiment under Colonel Krišjānis Berķis, had 5,990 infantry and 125 cavalry. The pro-German forces had 5,500–6,300 infantry, 500–600 cavalry and a strong advantage in cannons, machine guns and mortars. German forces achieved some success around Limbaži, but were soon pushed back. The Landeswehr main attack started on 21 June, breaking through the positions of the 2nd Latvian Cēsis Regiment at the Rauna River. The situation became critical for the 3rd Estonian Division, but the German assault was stopped by three Estonian armoured trains and the Kuperjanov Partisan Battalion.

The Landeswehr continued attacking at several parts of the front, and more Estonian forces joined the battle. After stopping the last German attacks, the Estonian forces started a full counter-attack on 23 June resulting in the recapture of Cēsis. The German units started a general retreat toward Riga.

== Aftermath ==
The Battle of Cēsis was a decisive victory for Estonia against the pro-German forces. The 3rd Estonian Division continued their advance towards Riga. On 3 July, the Estonian forces were at the outskirts of the city. Estonia, Latvia and the pro-German Provisional Government of Latvia signed the Ceasefire of Strazdumuiža on the demands of the Entente. The armistice restored the Ulmanis government in Riga. German forces were ordered to leave Latvia, with the Baltic-German Landeswehr put under the command of the Latvian government and sent to fight against the Red Army. However, to circumvent the Entente's orders, many German soldiers instead of leaving, were incorporated into the West Russian Volunteer Army. Fighting in Latvia and Lithuania restarted in October and continued until December 1919.

Estonia celebrates the anniversary of the battle as Victory Day, a national holiday. Common annual commemoration events of the battle are held on 22 June (Latvia's Victory Day, Latvian: Latvijas Uzvaras diena) at the Freedom Monument in Cēsis, Latvia.

== See also ==
- Latvian War of Independence
- Estonian War of Independence
- Baltische Landeswehr
- Freikorps in the Baltic

== Citations and references ==
=== Cited sources ===
- Traksmaa, August (1992). Lühike vabadussõja ajalugu (in Estonian). Olion. ISBN 5-450-01325-6.
- (in Latvian) Pētersone, Inta (1999). Latvijas Brīvības cīņas 1918-1920 : enciklopēdija (in Latvian). Riga: Preses nams. ISBN 9984-00-395-7. OCLC 43426410.
- Kaevats, Ülo (1998). Eesti Entsüklopeedia 10 (in Estonian). Tallinn: Eesti Entsüklopeediakirjastus. ISBN 5-89900-054-6.
