= Rüdiger von der Goltz =

German military personnel (1865–1946)

Graf Rüdiger von der Goltz
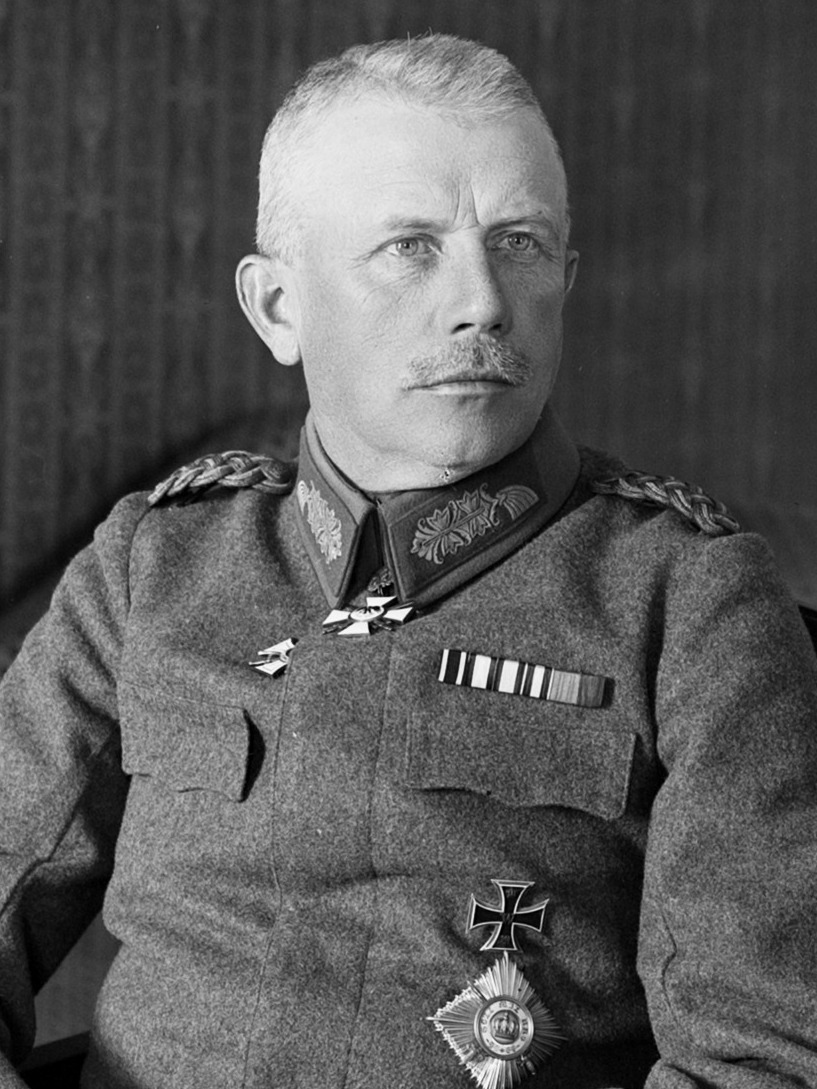
- Goltz in 1918
- Born: 8 December 1865; Züllichau, Province of Brandenburg, Kingdom of Prussia, German Confederation (present-day Sulechow, Lubusz Voivodeship, Poland)
- Died: 4 November 1946 (aged 80); Bernbeuren, Upper Bavaria, Bavaria, Allied-occupied Germany
- Military career
- Allegiance: German Empire
- Branch: Imperial German Army
- Service years: 1885–1918
- Rank: Major General
- Commands: Baltic Sea Division; Baltische Landeswehr
- Conflicts: First World War; Finnish Civil War; Latvian War of Independence; Estonian War of Independence
- Awards: Iron Cross 1st Class; Iron Cross 2nd Class; Pour le Mérite; 1st Class of the Order of the Cross of Liberty with swords and diamonds

Gustav Adolf Joachim Rüdiger Graf von der Goltz (8 December 1865 – 4 November 1946) was a German army general during the First World War. He commanded the Baltic Sea Division, which intervened decisively in the Finnish Civil War in the spring of 1918, landing at Hanko and capturing Helsinki. After the armistice Goltz remained in Finland until December 1918, exercising significant political influence; the Quartermaster General of the White Army, Hannes Ignatius, described him as the "true regent of Finland". In 1919 he commanded German and Baltic German forces in Latvia, defeating the Bolsheviks and capturing Riga, before being recalled under Allied pressure in October 1919. After the war he was active in right-wing nationalist politics in Germany, participating in the Kapp Putsch and later the Harzburg Front.

== Early life ==
Born into the Goltz noble family in Züllichau, Brandenburg, he was the son of Count Gustav Albrecht von der Goltz (1831–1909) and his wife, Cäcilie von Perbandt (1839–1871).

== Military career ==
=== First World War ===
After training at the war academy, Goltz served at the general staff of the Imperial German Army. He was seriously wounded at the Battle of the Marne in 1914, subsequently commanded a brigade, served on the Eastern Front, and returned to the Western Front, taking part in the battles of the Somme and Chemin des Dames. By the summer of 1917 he had been promoted to command the 37th Infantry Division.

=== Finnish Civil War ===
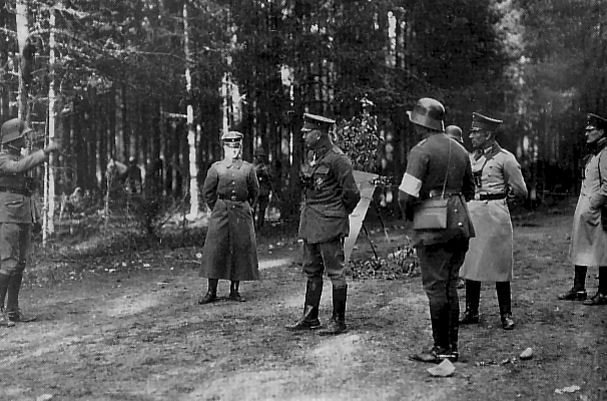
Goltz in Finland (1918)

In March 1918, Goltz was transferred to Finland to aid the nationalist White government in the Finnish Civil War against the Finnish "Reds" and Soviet Russian troops. He commanded the Baltic Sea Division, comprising 9,500 German soldiers and 400 Finnish volunteers, which landed at Hanko between 3 and 5 April 1918 without encountering resistance. The division then marched on the socialist-controlled capital Helsinki, which fell after the Battle of Helsinki on 13 April 1918.

In principle subordinate to the commander-in-chief of the White forces, General Gustaf Mannerheim, Goltz in practice exploited his isolation to retain independent command over the German troops and the White units attached to them. The German military intervention aided the nationalist government to gain control over most of the country by May 1918.

Goltz remained in Finland after the civil war, appointed "German General in Finland" with the task of commanding the remaining German troops and directing the training of the new Finnish army. He wielded significant political influence, particularly in foreign policy and in the project to establish a monarchy in Finland. In the summer of 1918, Goltz wanted to replace the Finnish White forces with a new Finnish conscript army, where all leadership positions were to be staffed by German officers. Finnish generals Ignatius, von Gerich and Theslöf resigned from the Finnish military staff in protest. Von der Goltz and his remaining troops left Finland on 6 December 1918.

=== Baltic campaign ===
The Inter-Allied Commission of Control insisted that the German troops remain in Latvia and Estonia to prevent the area from being re-occupied by the Soviet Red Army. As many of the demoralised German soldiers were being withdrawn from Latvia, a Freikorps unit called the "Iron Division" (German: Eiserne Division) was formed and deployed in Riga. New volunteers arriving from Germany and remnants of the German 8th Army were subsequently added to the Iron Division, assigned under the command of Goltz. Baltic Germans and some Latvians also formed the Baltische Landeswehr, led by Major Alfred Fletcher.

In late February 1919, only the seaport of Libau (Liepāja) remained in the hands of the German and Latvian forces. In March 1919, Goltz won a series of victories over the Red Army, first occupying Windau (Ventspils), the major port of Courland, and then advancing south and east to retake Riga on 23 May 1919.

After the Bolsheviks had been driven out from most of Latvia, the Allies ordered the German government to withdraw its troops from the Baltic region. Goltz resisted, and with the assistance of the local German population deposed the Latvian nationalist government while Freikorps, Latvian and White Russian units captured Riga on 23 May 1919. The Latvian nationalists sought assistance from the Estonian army, which had been occupying northern Latvia since earlier that year.

In June 1919, Goltz ordered his troops to advance not east against the Red Army, as the Allies had expected, but north against the Estonians. On 19 June, the Iron Division and Landeswehr units attacked around Wenden (Cēsis), but were defeated by the 3rd Estonian Division under Ernst Põdder in the Battle of Cēsis. Under Allied pressure, a ceasefire was imposed when Estonian and Latvian forces were advancing on Riga. Goltz turned his troops over to the West Russian Volunteer Army in the Mitau mutiny of August 1919 and was recalled by the German government in October 1919.

In his memoirs, Goltz claimed that his principal strategic goal had been to march on St. Petersburg in cooperation with White Russian forces and install a pro-German anti-Bolshevist government in Russia — an ambition the Allies had frustrated.

=== Later career ===
After leaving military service, Goltz participated in the Kapp Putsch in March 1920. He then devoted himself to nationalist politics, heading the youth organisation Arbeitsgemeinschaft der vaterländischen Jugend from 1924 to 1930 and serving as President of the Vereinigten vaterländischen Verbände Deutschlands (VvVD) (United Patriotic Associations of Germany). In 1931 he joined the Harzburg Front, the nationalist alliance led by the National Socialists.

Von der Goltz maintained lifelong ties to Finland, regularly visiting the country and staying with his friend J. K. Paasikivi, with whom he discussed the future of Europe. At the 15th anniversary celebrations of the capture of Helsinki in 1933, he attended as official guest of honour and sought to promote closer ties between Finland and the National Socialist regime in Germany, which he regarded as the guarantor of Germany's resurgence. He was promoted to lieutenant general in 1936 and was retired when the Second World War broke out.

== Personal life ==
On 3 March 1893 in Potsdam, Goltz married Hannah Caroline Helene Marie von Hase (1873–1941), daughter of Karl Alfred von Hase (1842–1914) and his wife, Countess Klara von Kalckreuth (1851–1903), paternal granddaughter of Karl August von Hase. The marriage lasted nearly five decades until Hannah's death in spring 1941. They had three sons:

- Count Gustav Adolf Karl Joachim Rüdiger von der Goltz (1894–1976), a lawyer and politician; lost a leg during the First World War. Married Astrid Marie Hjort (1896–1948) and had issue.
- Count Hans von der Goltz (1895–1914); killed in action during the First World War.
- Count Georg-Conrad Gustav Dankwart Carl Gottfried von der Goltz (1902–1985); married Wanda Adelheid Hjort (b. 1902) and had issue.

== Works ==
- Goltz, Rüdiger von der: Meine Sendung in Finnland und im Baltikum (Leipzig, 1920)
