= Dāvids Sīmansons =

Latvian general (1859–1933)

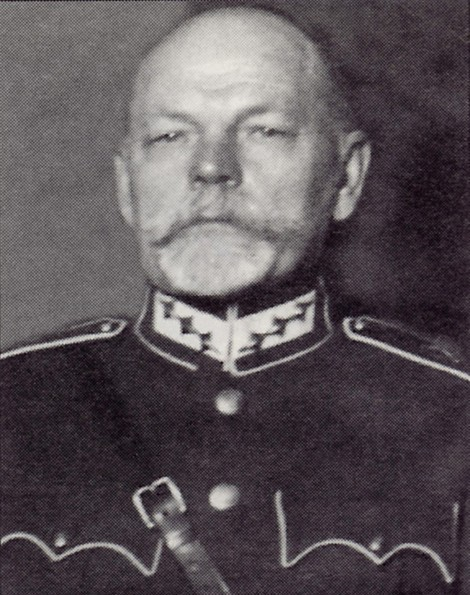
- Born: 4 April 1859; Valmiera Parish, Governorate of Livonia, Russian Empire
- Died: 13 January 1933 (aged 73); Riga, Latvia
- Burial place: Brothers' Cemetery, Riga, Latvia
- Military career
- Allegiance: Russian Empire; Latvia
- Branch: Imperial Russian Army; Latvian National Armed Forces
- Service years: 1880–1917; 1919–1925
- Rank: Major General (Russia); General (Latvia)
- Conflicts: Russo-Japanese War; World War I Latvian War of Independence

Dāvids Sīmansons (4 April 1859 – 13 January 1933) was the first commander-in-chief of the Latvian Army. He was also a general of the Latvian Army, major general of the Imperial Russian Army and the Former Minister of War of Latvia. He was a recipient of the Commander of the Order of Lāčplēsis.

== Biography ==
Sīmansons was born in Valmiera Parish, in a family of agricultural workers. He graduated from Limbaži district school. In 1880, he began his military service by voluntarily joining the Imperial Russian Army on the 115th Vyazma Infantry Regiment. During his service, he was sent to a Junker school, after graduation of which he obtained the rank of an officer. After training, he returned to the Vyazma Infantry Regiment. In 1894 he graduated from the General Staff Academy. After its completion, he commanded the regiment. Sīmansons participated in the Russo-Japanese War, where he suffered a contusion during combat operations. In 1910 he was promoted to colonel. In April 1912, he was appointed commander of the 66th Butyrsk Regiment. Sīmansons then fought in the First World War. On 27 October 1914 he was awarded the Sword of the Order of St. George. Promoted to major general in May 1915, at the same time he was appointed commander of the 2nd Brigade of the 17th Infantry Division. Retired from service in October 1917.

Until the end of 1918 he lived in Vitebsk, but later in Oryol. He returned to his homeland in January 1919. Sīmansons arrived in Riga on 8 January, and on 6 June he joined the Latvian National Armed Forces. On 10 July, after the unification of the Northern Latvian and Southern Latvian brigades and the formation of the Latvian Army, he was appointed its first commander-in-chief. From 15 July to 10 September he was also a Minister of Defense (Minister of War from 1923).

After Pavel Bermondt-Avalov's forces advanced towards Riga, the front commander Col. Jorģis Zemitāns gave an order to retire from Riga to positions in Jugla. On the night of 9–10 October General Sīmansons revoked this order because he had decided to resist Bermondt's forces and defend Riga. With his energetic actions he reorganized the positions of the army and helped to defend Riga from the West Russian Volunteer Army.

On 16 October Colonel Jānis Balodis, who was the commander of the Eastern Front and the commander of the Kurzeme Division, was appointed the Commander-in-Chief of the Latvian Army, replacing Sīmansons.

Until February 1922, Sīmansons was a member of the Supreme Military Court. After leaving the post of Commander-in-Chief, he continued his service on the Military Council of the Republic of Latvia. Retired in February 1925 (due to illness). He led a quiet life after his service, avoiding active political and social life.

On 11 November 1926 he was awarded the third class of the Order of Lāčplēsis. Sīmansons did not receive it at the Lāčplēsis Day ceremony, where it was personally presented by President Jānis Čakste, but received it later since he had not attended the award ceremony.

In June 1932, the health of the old general deteriorated. This was due to Arteriosclerosis diagnosed by doctors. In July, due to an exacerbation of the disease, he was transferred to the Riga War Hospital. He spent the following months in hospital. In January of the following year, his health deteriorated. 1933. On 13 January, at 2:10 pm, at the age of 73, General Sīmansons died at the Riga War Hospital. On 18 January he was buried in the Brothers' Cemetery in Riga in honor of his service of Latvia.

== Awards ==
- (Latvia) Order of Lāčplēsis (III class)
- (Latvia) Aizsargi Cross of Merit
- (Russian Empire) Saint George Sword
- (Russian Empire) Order of Saint Vladimir (Classes III and IV)
- (Russian Empire) Order of Saint Anna (Class II)
- (Russian Empire) Order of Saint Stanislaus (1st, 3rd class)

== Bibliography ==
- Section of the Latvian National Encyclopedia
- Short article in memory of the general
- Short biography of D. Sīmansons
