= Latvian Provisional Government =

Latvian Provisional Government Latvijas Pagaidu valdība
- Provisional government
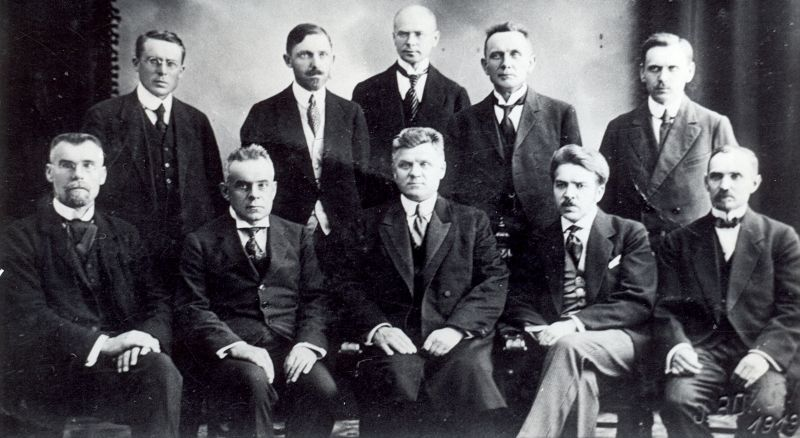
- Formation: 18 November 1918
- Extinction: 20 June 1920
- Country: Latvia

Executive
- Prime Minister: Kārlis Ulmanis

Legislative branch
- Legislature: People's Council

The Latvian Provisional Government (Latvian: Latvijas Pagaidu valdība) was formed on November 18, 1918 by the People's Council of Latvia as the interim government of the newly-proclaimed Republic of Latvia during the Latvian War of Independence. The term encompasses three cabinets led by Kārlis Ulmanis, the leader of the Agrarian Union, who was chosen to be Prime Minister. The Ulmanis' government led the country until the formation of an elected cabinet after the elections to the Constitutional Assembly of Latvia in June 1920.

== History ==
After the Proclamation of the Independence of the Republic of Latvia on November 18, 1918, the interim parliament – the People's Council of Latvia – chose Kārlis Ulmanis to form the country's first government. In December, the first ministries were created.

From December 1918 until May 1919, the Latvian territories (that were not under German occupation) were invaded and controlled by a provisional Soviet Latvian government led by Pēteris Stučka. During these months, the Ulmanis government had evacuated from the capital Riga to the western city of Liepāja, which was defended by troops of the nascent Latvian armed forces and the Baltic German Landeswehr. Joint military operations of the growing Latvian armed forces of the Ulmanis government together with the Landeswehr and the German Freikorps, coupled with supportive attacks from the Estonian Army in Vidzeme, succeeded in pushing Soviet armies back into Latgale during the late spring of 1919.

In April 1919, however, the German forces attempted a coup d'état in an effort to install a pro-German puppet government led by pastor Andrievs Niedra. With protection from the British Royal Navy and the French Navy the Ulmanis government took refuge on the ship Saratov in the Baltic Sea near the coast of Latvia. After the German forces were forced to leave Riga due to an Estonian-Latvian offensive and the Niedra government collapsed, the Ulmanis cabinet was able to return to land in July 1919.

After the liberation of Latgale in January, the Ulmanis government signed an armistice with Soviet Russia on February 21, 1920, and a peace treaty on August 11, 1920.

Elections for the Constituent Assembly were held in Latvia between 14 and 16 April 1920. The interim government was succeeded by the elected First Ulmanis cabinet, which was approved on June 20, 1920.

== See also ==
- Latvian Provisional National Council
- Ober Ost
- Latvian War of Independence
