= Oskars Kalpaks =

Latvian military officer

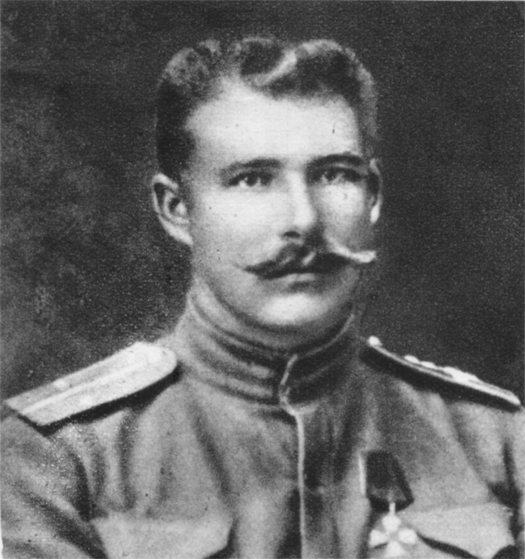
- Oskars Kalpaks
- Born: 6 January 1882; Meirāni, Governorate of Livonia (present-day Indrāni parish, Lubāna municipality, Latvia)
- Died: 6 March 1919 (aged 37); Airīte, Saldus district (present-day Zirņi parish, Saldus municipality, Latvia)
- Military career
- Allegiance: Imperial Russia; Republic of Latvia
- Branch: Imperial Russian Army; National Armed Forces of Latvia
- Service years: 18 January 1903 – 6 March 1919
- Rank: Lieutenant Colonel (podpalkovnik), Russia; Colonel, Latvia
- Units: 183rd Pultusk Infantry Regiment; 1st Latvian Independent Battalion ("Independence battalion")
- Commands: 1st Latvian Independent Battalion
- Conflicts: First World War; Latvian War of Independence †
- Awards: Cross of St. George, IV degree; Order of St. Anna, IV degree; Lacplesis Military Order, I Class (posthumously)

Oskars Kalpaks (6 January 1882 – 6 March 1919) was the commander of 1st Latvian Independent Battalion, also known as "Kalpaks Battalion".

Kalpaks was born in a farming family. Having decided to become a soldier he completed Irkutsk military school and then commenced service with the 183rd Pultusk Infantry Regiment. He displayed talent as a commander and heroism in battle during the First World War and was awarded the most significant Russian military decorations and made Regiment Commander in 1917.

After the proclamation of Latvia's independence on 18 November 1918, Kalpaks enlisted with the Ministry of Defence. He organised the defence of Vidzeme against Bolshevik attacks. On 31 December, Kalpaks became Commander-in-Chief of all the armed units at the disposal of the Provisional Government of Latvia.

Under his leadership, Latvia's first armed formations became battle capable. On 28 February 1919, Kalpaks was awarded the rank of Colonel. From January to March 1919 the 1st Latvian Battalion fought with the German VI Reserve Corps to repel the Bolshevik raids into Kurzeme and this was the start of Latvia's struggle for liberation. On 6 March 1919 near Airītes, by mistake, Kalpaks was killed in a skirmish with German Freikorps troops.

After his death, Kalpaks was posthumously awarded Latvia's highest military award, the Order of Lāčplēsis — first, second and third class.

Although never officially assigned to this rank or position, Kalpaks is regarded as the first Commander in Chief of Latvian Armed Forces.

Kalpaks was honored on Latvian stamps in 1937 and again in 2007.
