= Battle of Jelgava (1919) =

- Part of Latvian War of Independence
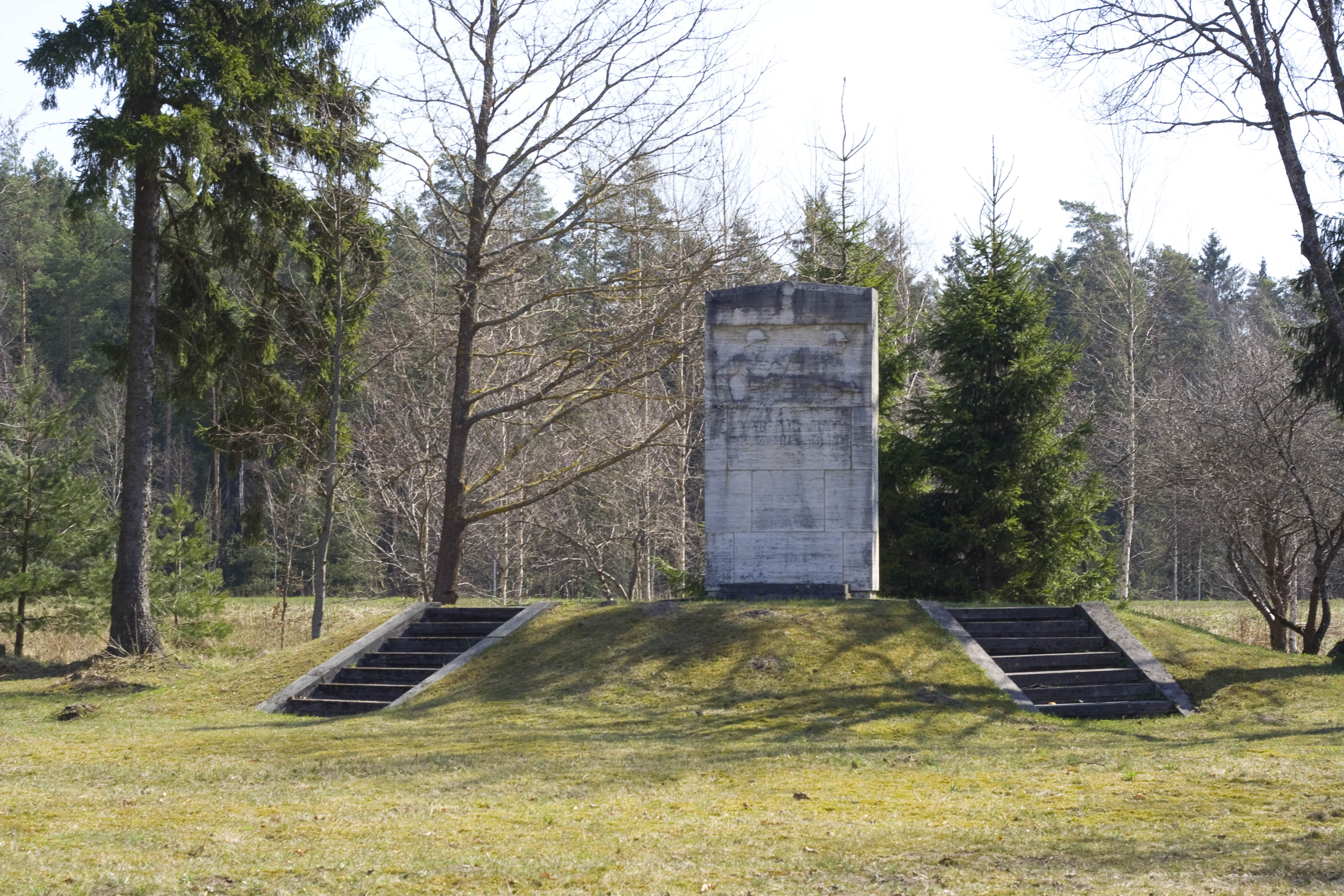
- Monument to the "Heroes of the Fatherland's Sons in 1919" at Skujas School, where on November 18, 1919, the 6th Riga Infantry Regiment stopped the Iron Cross-air strike. Sculptors Mārtiņš Šmalcs, Kārlis Zāle (1937, restored in 1987).
Date	15–21 November 1919
Location	Ozolnieku novads, Latvia 56°41′33″N 23°46′43″E
Result	Latvian victory

Belligerents
(Latvia) Latvian Army	West Russian Volunteer Army

The Battle of Jelgava was an operation of the Latvian Army from 15 to 21 November 1919 during the Latvian War of Independence against the Western Russian Volunteer army. Throughout the summer and autumn months the city of Jelgava was the headquarters of the paramilitary German-Russian forces under Colonel Prince Bermondt-Avalov. After the Bermondtian Affair, where German paramilitary forces laid siege to Riga until November 10, 1919, the Latvian Army conducted an offensive to force the units of the Western Russian Volunteer army subordinated to the Weimar Republic to leave Jelgava.

The main battle took place in Ozolnieki district. Due to the disorganized retreat from Riga, the Bermondtian defenses were quickly breached and the city taken with minimal damage to the city. Because of this attack, the German Government's intention to start ceasefire talks and reach agreement on the further political status of Courland and Zemgale with Latvian Provisional Government failed.
