= Latvian War of Independence =

1918–20 conflict between the newly-declared Republic of Latvia and the Russian SFSR

- Part of Russian Civil War, Polish–Soviet War and Estonian War of Independence
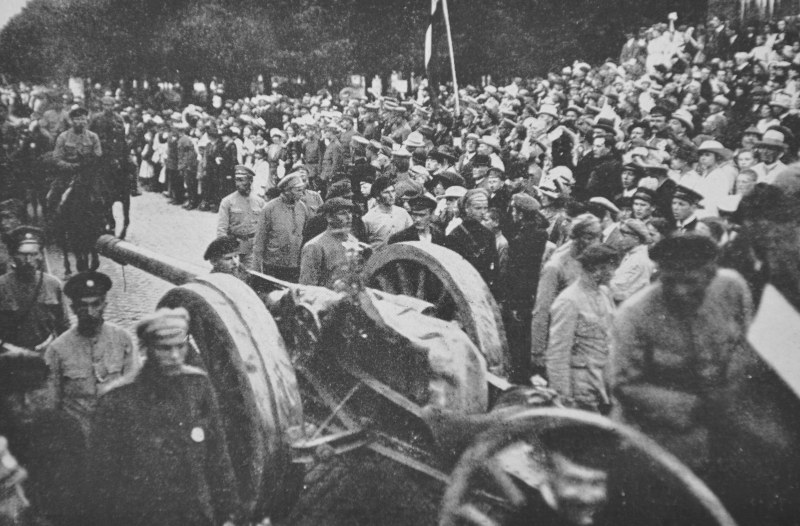
- The North Latvian Brigade entering Riga in 1919
Date	1 December 1918 – 11 August 1920 (1 year, 8 months, 1 week and 3 days)
Location	Latvia
Result	Latvian victory; Latvian–Soviet Peace Treaty; West Russian Volunteer Army evacuate to East Prussia
Territorial changes	Independence of Latvia

Belligerents
1918 – April 1919: Latvia (Note: All Latvian national units with formal allegiance to Latvian Provisional Government were under German and Estonian military commands at this period.); (German Empire) VI Reserve Corps; (German Empire) 1st Guards Reserve Division; Baltische Landeswehr; (Latvia) Latvian Independent Brigade; (Russia) Lieven detachment; Eiserne Division; Estonia; (Finland) Finnish volunteers; (Latvia) North Latvian Brigade		1918 – April 1919: Soviet Russia; Soviet Latvia
April–July 1919: Latvia; Estonia; (Latvia) North Latvian Brigade; (Denmark) Danish volunteers; (Russia) Lieven detachment (Note: Fought only against Soviets.)	April–July 1919: (German Empire) VI Reserve Corps; (German Empire) 1st Guards Reserve Division; Baltische Landeswehr; (Latvia) (South) Latvian Independent Brigade; Eiserne Division; Bermontians	April–July 1919: Soviet Russia; Soviet Latvia
July 1919–1920: Latvia (Note: Latvian Armed Forces were formed on July 10, 1919 with merger of (South) Latvian Independent Brigade and North Latvian Brigade.); Baltische Landeswehr; Poland; Estonia; United Kingdom (Note: Naval support.); France	October–December 1919: West Russian Volunteer Army (Note: Fought only against Latvia and its allies.); Freikorps; (Russia) Russian units	July 1919–1920: Soviet Russia; Soviet Latvia

Commanders and leaders
(Latvia) Kārlis Ulmanis (Latvia) Oskars Kalpaks † (Latvia) Jānis Balodis (Latvia) Dāvids Sīmansons (Latvia) Jorģis Zemitāns (Latvia) Roberts Dambītis (Estonia) Ernst Põdder (Estonia) Viktor Puskar (Second Polish Republic) Edward Rydz-Śmigły (United Kingdom of Great Britain and Ireland) Harold Alexander	(German Empire) Rüdiger von der Goltz (German Empire) Alfred Fletcher (German Empire) Josef Bischoff (Russia) Pavel Bermondt-Avalov (German Empire) Walter von Eberhardt	(Russian Soviet Federative Socialist Republic) Vladimir Lenin (Russian Soviet Federative Socialist Republic) Leon Trotsky (Russian Soviet Federative Socialist Republic) Jukums Vācietis (Russian Soviet Federative Socialist Republic) Sergei Kamenev (Russian Soviet Federative Socialist Republic) Dmitry Nadyozhny (Russian Soviet Federative Socialist Republic) Vladimir Gittis (Russian Soviet Federative Socialist Republic) Pēteris Slavens #

Strength
(Latvia) 69,232 soldiers: 54 canons; 271 machine guns; 321 light-machine guns; (January 1920); (Estonia) 6,509 infantry; 65 cavalry; 106 heavy machine guns; 126 light machine guns; 23 artillery pieces; 3 armoured vehicles; 3 armoured trains; (June 1919); (Poland) 22,000 soldiers; 25 tanks; (January 1920); (United Kingdom) 1 aircraft carrier; 1 monitor; 23 light cruisers; 85 destroyers; 20 submarines; 2 minelayers; 18 minesweepers; 10 coastal motor boats; 4 depot ships	(German Empire) 45,000 soldiers: 10 armoured vehicles; 3 armoured trains; 18 airplanes; 100 artillery; 469 machine guns; (June 1919)	(Latvian Socialist Soviet Republic) 45,000 soldiers: 600 machine-guns; 98 field-guns; 3 armoured trains; (Russian Soviet Federative Socialist Republic) 5,600 – 6,300 soldiers; 55 machine-guns; 42 guns; 3 armoured trains

Casualties and losses
(Latvia) 3,046 killed: 4,085 wounded; (Estonia) 300 killed; 800 wounded	(German Empire) 840 killed: 3,000 wounded	(Russian Soviet Federative Socialist Republic) 8,000 killed: At least 2,000 captured; 11 executed

The Latvian War of Independence (Latvian: Latvijas Neatkarības karš), sometimes called Latvia's freedom battles (Latvijas brīvības cīņas) or the Latvian War of Liberation (Latvijas atbrīvošanas karš), was a series of military conflicts in Latvia between 5 December 1918, after the newly proclaimed Republic of Latvia was invaded by Soviet Russia, and the signing of the Latvian-Soviet Riga Peace Treaty on 11 August 1920.

The war can be divided into several stages: Soviet offensive of 1918–1919, German-Latvian liberation of Kurzeme and Riga, Estonian-Latvian liberation of Vidzeme, Bermontian offensive, and Latvian-Polish liberation of Latgale.

The war involved Latvia (its provisional government supported by Estonia, Poland and the Western Allies—particularly the navies of the United Kingdom and France) against the Russian SFSR and the Bolsheviks' short-lived Latvian Socialist Soviet Republic. Germany and the Baltic nobility added another level of intrigue, initially being nominally allied to the Nationalist/Allied force in repelling the Soviet forces, but attempting to jockey for German domination of Latvia. Eventually, tensions flared up after a German coup against the Latvian government in the spring of 1919, leading to open war.

Following a cease-fire, a ploy was developed by the Germans, nominally dissolving into the West Russian Volunteer Army led by Gen. Pavel Bermont-Avalov. This West Russian Volunteer Army (sometimes called the Bermontians) included Germans and former Russian prisoners of war nominally allied with the White Army in the Russian Civil War, but both Bermondt-Avalov and von der Goltz were more interested in eliminating the nationalists than fighting the Bolsheviks. The ploy was thwarted by the Latvian, Estonian and Allied forces as the Bermontians were stopped on the left bank of the capital Riga by October 1919. By November, a counter-attack was launched against the Bermontians, and by the end of the year they had retreated into East Prussia and disbanded.

After the expulsion of the West Russian Liberation Army, the Landeswehr was once again put under Latvian and Allied control, with the force now advancing of Soviet-held Latgale in eastern Latvia. With the assistance of the Second Polish Republic and Estonia, the Latvian forces cleared Latgale from the Soviet forces by February 1920, effectively ending the war until a peace treaty in August 1920.

Certain episodes of the Latvian Independence War were also part of the Polish-Soviet War, particularly the Battle of Daugavpils.

== Soviet offensive ==
On 18 November 1918 the People's Council of Latvia proclaimed the Independence of the Republic of Latvia and created the Latvian Provisional Government headed by Kārlis Ulmanis.

On 1 December 1918, the newly proclaimed republic was invaded by Soviet Russia. Much of the invading army in Latvia consisted of Red Latvian Riflemen, which made the invasion easier. The Soviet offensive met little resistance.

In the north Alūksne was taken on 7 December, Valka on 18 December, and Cēsis on 23 December, in the south Daugavpils was taken on 9 December, and finally Pļaviņas on 17 December.

Riga was captured by the Red Army on 3 January 1919. By the end of January, the Latvian Provisional Government and remaining German units had retreated all the way to Liepāja, but then the Red offensive stalled along the Venta river.

The Latvian Socialist Soviet Republic was officially proclaimed on 13 January with the political, economic, and military backing of Soviet Russia and on 17 January, a constitution was made for the newly made puppet state.

During this period, on 15 January, occurred the battle of Lielauce, where the Latvian independent battalion, headed by Oskars Kalpaks managed to stop the Soviet offensive. This battle was crucial for the morale of the Latvian soldiers. The German forces on whom the Latvian temporarily relied, however, had lost a battle at Auce, so an order was received to retreat to the river Venta.

14 days later, on 29 January, the Latvian independent battalion was once again fighting a battle, this time near Skrunda. This time, however, Latvian troops were on the offensive. The Soviet forces had managed to establish a bridgehead over the river Venta, capturing the town of Skrunda on 22 January. The Venta defensive line had to be reestablished, so a counter-offensive maneuver was ordered to be overtaken. The Latvian independent battalion managed to retake the town in 3 hours. After the battle was won, the Soviet offensives ceased.

== Liberation of Kurzeme and the coup d'etat ==
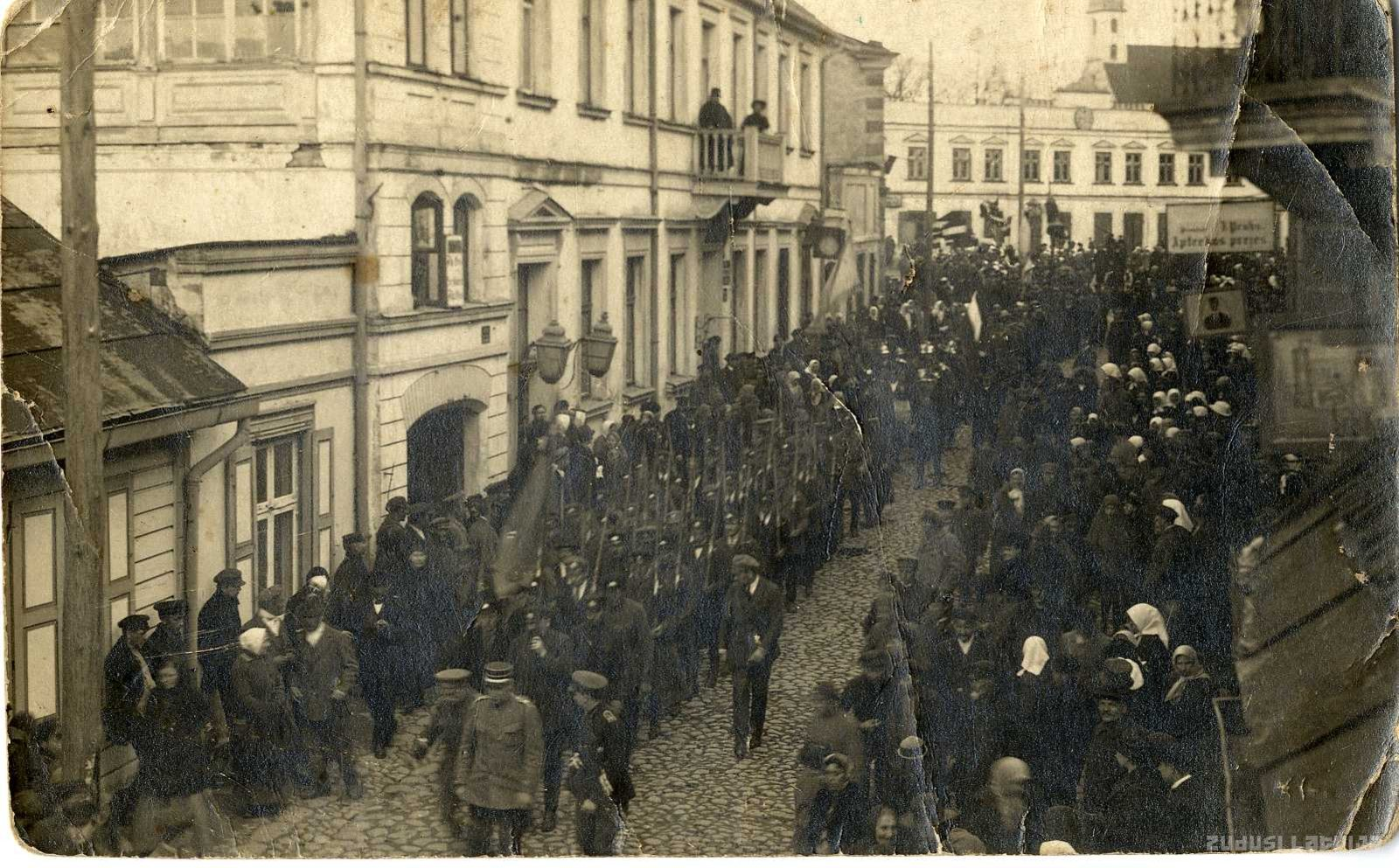
Soldiers mobilized by the Provisional Government of Latvia marching along Jūras Street in Limbaži in 1919

On 18 February, an agreement was signed between Latvia and Estonia, starting formation of the North Latvian Brigade led by Jorģis Zemitāns on Estonian territory.

On 3 March, the German and Latvian forces commenced a counterattack against the Red Latvian Riflemen. Tukums was recaptured from the Bolsheviks on 15 March, and Jelgava on 18 March.

On 16 April, the Baltic nobility organised a coup d'etat in Liepāja and a puppet government headed by Andrievs Niedra was established. The provisional national government took refuge aboard the steamship Saratov under British protection in Liepāja harbour.

On 22 May, Riga was recaptured by the Iron Division and organised persecution of suspected Bolshevik supporters began, with an estimated 174 (according to the head of Rīga's Gendarmerie) to 4,000–5,000 people (according to local social democrats and communists) being shot. At the same time the Estonian Army including the North Latvian Brigade loyal to the Ulmanis government started a major offensive against the Soviets in north Latvia. By the middle of June, the Soviet rule was reduced to the area surrounding Latgale.

== German–Estonian conflict ==
After the capture of Riga the Baltische Landeswehr and Iron Division advanced north towards Cēsis. The objective of the Landeswehr and Iron Division had now clearly become the establishment of German supremacy in the Baltic by eliminating the Estonian military and Latvian national units, not the defeat of the Bolsheviks. The Estonian commander General Johan Laidoner insisted the Landeswehr withdraw to a line south of the Gauja River. He also ordered the Estonian 3rd Division to seize the Gulbene railroad station.

On June 19, 1919, the Landeswehr and the Iron Division launched an attack to capture Cēsis. Initially, the Freikorps formation captured the town of Straupe and continued their advance toward the town of Limbaži. The Estonian division launched a counterattack and drove the Landeswehr out of the town. On June 21, the Estonians received reinforcements and immediately attacked the Landeswehr, who withdrew from an area to the northeast of Cēsis. The Iron Division attacked from Straupe towards Stalbe in an effort to relieve pressure on the Landeswehr. On the morning of June 23, the Landeswehr began a general retreat toward Riga.

The Allies again insisted that the Landeswehr and Iron Division withdraw their remaining troops from Latvia, and on July 3 intervened to impose an armistice between Estonia, Latvia, and the Landeswehr and Iron Division when the Latvians were about to march into Riga. By its terms the legitimate government of Ulmanis was to be restored, the Baltic German Landeswehr be placed under the command of the British officer Harold Alexander and the Iron Division to leave Latvia. The government of Ulmanis returned to Riga on 8 July 1919 and the Landeswehr became a component of the Latvian National Army.

== Bermondt offensive ==
The Iron Division, however, did not leave Latvia. Instead Major Bischoff created a German and Russian united Legion from over a dozen Freikorps units and Russian volunteers, then he turned the units over to the West Russian Volunteer Army which was commanded by Pavel Bermondt-Avalov. In total, the Iron Division transferred over 14,000 men, 64 aircraft, 56 artillery pieces, and 156 machine guns. Six cavalry units and a field hospital were also transferred. Together with the other German units Bermondt had 30 000 men strong army only 6000 of whom were Russians.

On October 8 the West Russian Volunteer Army started offensive against Riga. The offensive in the beginning saw huge potential, the Latvian government evacuated from Riga, and the left bank of Daugava river in Riga got captured by the Bermondt forces. However, on October 15 Latvians crossed Daugava river north of Riga and captured Bolderāja and Daugavgrīva fortress. On November 10–11, 1919, the Latvian Armed Forces started a day long counter-offensive, the outnumbered Latvians managed to push the Bermondt forces out of Riga, after which the Latvian government returned to Riga. Jelgava was also captured by the Latvians in loss-making fights and by early December the entire West Russian Volunteer Army got pushed out of Latvia.

== Liberation of Latgale ==
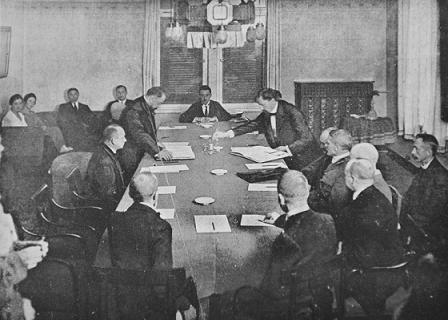
Signing of the Latvian-Soviet Russian Peace Treaty in Riga, 1920

In January 1920 the joint forces of Latvia and Poland launched an attack on the Bolsheviks in Latgale and took Daugavpils. The Soviet Latvian government escaped to Velikiye Luki where it announced its dissolution on January 13. Units from the Estonian and Lithuanian armies also saw action alongside the Latvians, as well as Latvian partisans. The push continued until Latvian forces took hold of Zilupe on February 1 with some skirmishes continuing a few days afterwards, since a secret truce had been agreed on by the Latvians and Soviet Russia on January 30.

Peace talks began on 16 April 1920 with the Latvian–Soviet Peace Treaty being signed on 11 August 1920, officially ending the war.

== Timeline ==
=== 1918 ===
- 11 November: The German Empire and Allies of World War I sign the November armistice, which marks the end of World War I; Soviet Russia launches an attack on German forces. The British Empire recognizes the de facto independence of Latvia (see Latvian Provisional National Council).
- 17 November: The first legislative institution of Latvia, the People's Council (Tautas Padome) and the provisional government are established. Jānis Čakste becomes the chairman of the People's Council, while Kārlis Ulmanis becomes prime minister.
- 18 November: The Republic of Latvia is proclaimed in Riga.
- 28 November: The Regency Council of the United Baltic Duchy is dissolved.
- 1 December: The Red Army invades Latvia.
- 7 December: An agreement is signed for the organisation of land defense forces between the Provisional Government of the Republic of Latvia and the German envoy August Winnig, representing the Baltische Landeswehr.
- 17 December: The government of the Latvian Socialist Soviet Republic, headed by Pēteris Stučka, is formed in Russia.
November 1918: After World War I most of Latvia was occupied by German forces (orange)

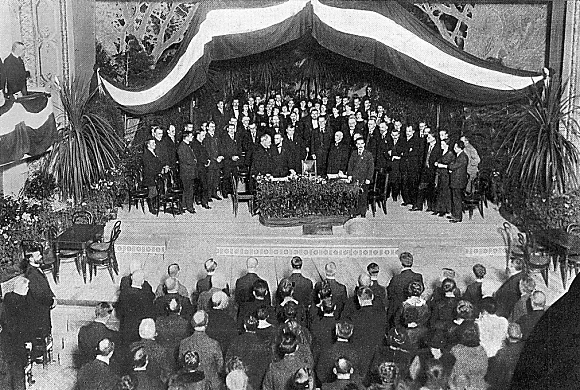
Proclamation of the Republic of Latvia on 18 November 1918

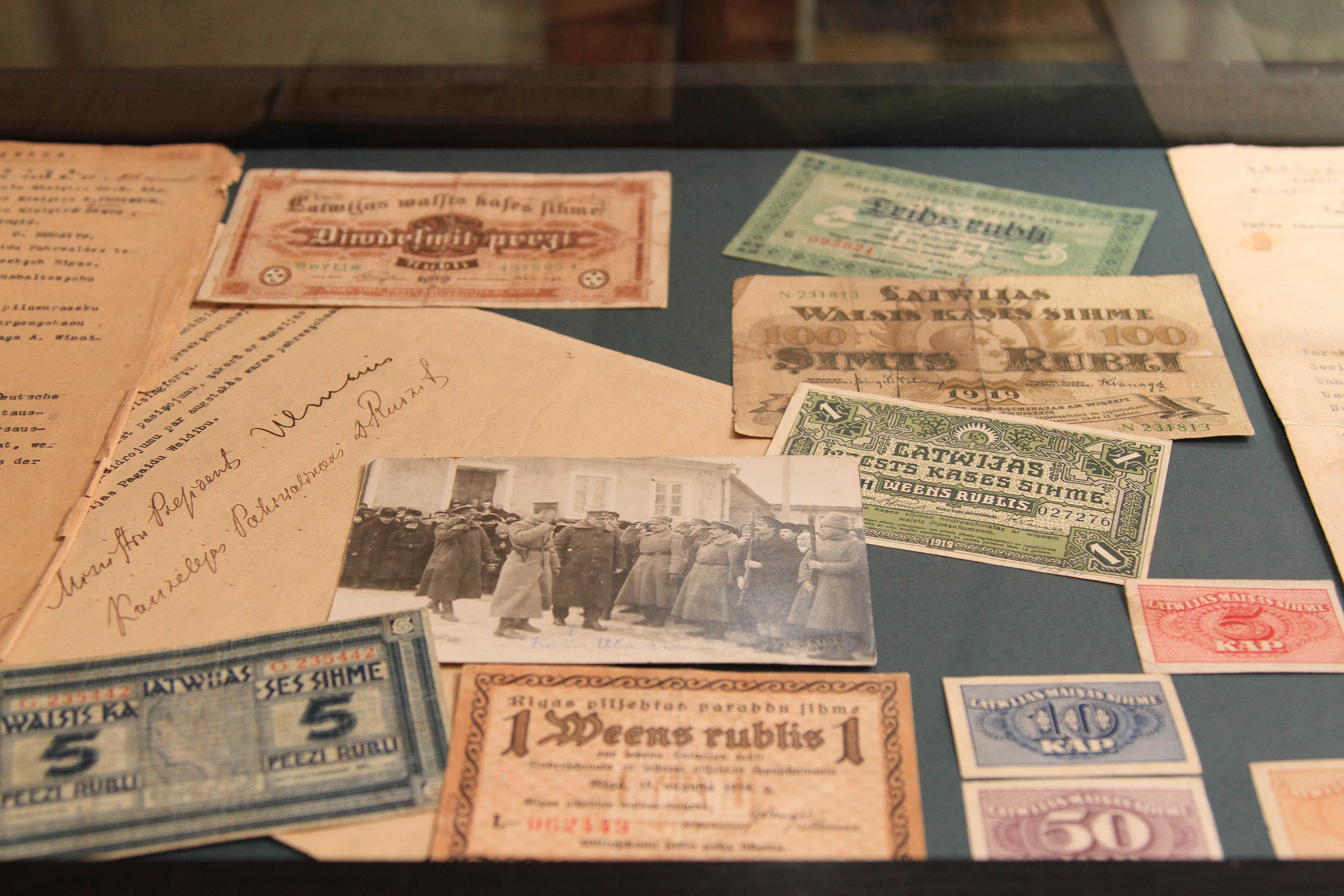
Currency issued by the Latvian Provisional Government in 1918–19

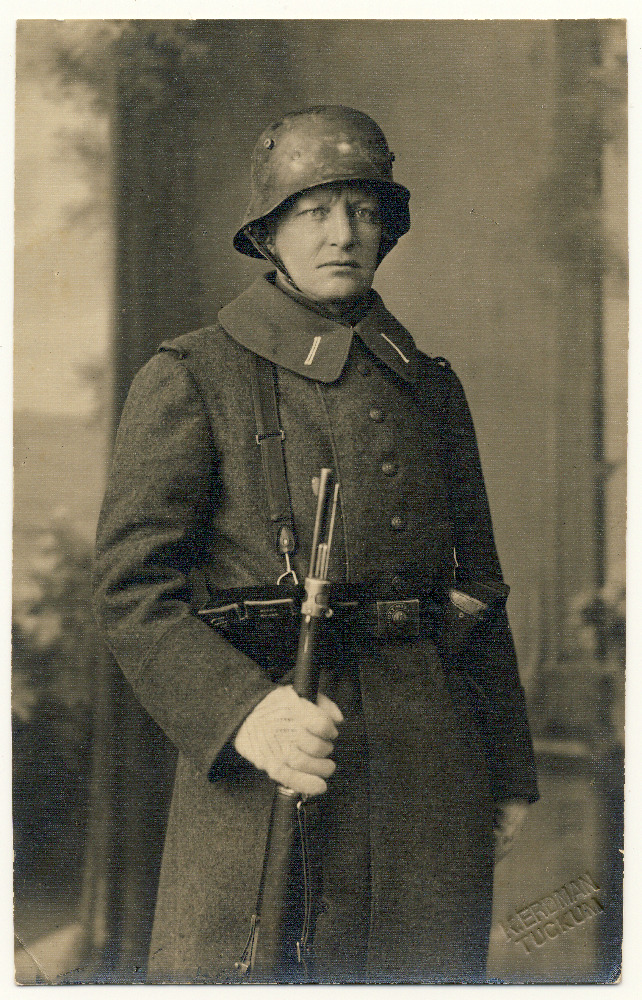
A soldier of the Baltische Landeswehr

=== 1919 ===
- 5 January: The first military unit of Latvia — the 1st Latvian Independent Battalion, under command of Oskars Kalpaks — is formed. The provisional government retreats from Jelgava to Liepāja.
- 31 January: Most of Latvia is under the control of the Red Army; the Latvian government and German forces control the area around Liepāja.
- 18 February: An agreement is signed between Estonia and Latvia, which provides for the formation of the North Latvian Brigade, led by Jorģis Zemitāns, on Estonian territory.
- 3 March: The united German and Latvian forces commence a counterattack against the forces of Soviet Latvia.
- 6 March: Oskars Kalpaks, commander of all Latvian forces subordinated to German headquarters, is killed by German friendly fire. He is replaced by Jānis Balodis.
- 10 March: Saldus comes under Latvian control.
- 21 March: 1st Latvian Independent Battalion is reformed into the Latvian Independent Brigade.
- 16 April: The puppet Latvian Government established by the Baltic nobility organizes a coup d'état in Liepāja, the provisional national government of Latvia takes refuge aboard the steamship Saratow under Allied protection.
- 16 May: The Estonian Army starts a major offensive against the Soviets in north Latvia.
- 22 May: The Baltische Landeswehr, under the command of Major Alfred Fletcher, captures Riga.
- 23 May: The Latvian Independent Brigade marches into Riga.
- 3 June: The Baltische Landeswehr reaches Cēsis.
- 6 June: The Landeswehr's North Latvian campaign begins, commanded by Major Alfred Fletcher.
- 23 June: The Estonian 3rd Division commanded by Gen. Ernst Põdder, including the 2nd Latvian Cēsis regiment of the North Latvian Brigade defeats the Landeswehr in the Battle of Cēsis.
- 3 July: Estonia, Latvia and the pro-German Provisional Government of Latvia sign the Ceasefire of Strazdumuiža.
- 6 July: The North Latvian Brigade enters Riga.
- 10 July: The North Latvian Brigade and the Independent Latvian (or South Latvian) Brigade are merged to form the Latvian Armed Forces (Latvian Army) on the order of its first Commander-in-Chief, General Dāvids Sīmansons.
- 5 October: The German mission under General Rüdiger von der Goltz secretly leaves Riga for Jelgava (German: Mitau), where the German-established West Russian Volunteer Army prepares for an attack on Riga.
- 8 October: The West Russian Volunteer Army, comprising German, Iron Division and White-movement Russian forces, attacks Riga, taking the Pārdaugava district.
- 20 October: Battle of Talsi.
- 3 November: The Latvian Army, supported by Estonian armored trains and the British Royal Navy, launches its counterattack.
- 5 November: Battle of Liepāja (German: Libau).
- 11 November: The Latvian Army, supported by Estonian armored trains, the Royal Navy and the French Navy, defeats the West Russian Volunteer Army in Riga. The date is celebrated as Lāčplēsis Day ever since.
- 21 November: The Latvian Army liberates Jelgava from the West Russian Volunteer Army.
- 22 November: The Lithuanian Army defeats the remnants of the West Russian Volunteer Army in Lithuania near Radviliškis.
6 March 1919: After the Soviet attack, most of Latvia is under control of the Bolsheviks (pink)

16 April 1919: In March the united German and Latvian forces (orange and yellow) launch counterattack, taking most of Courland

22 June 1919: The 3rd Estonian Division (purple) confronted German forces at Cēsis in the beginning of June and gained victory on 23 June

11 November 1919: Latvian army has taken most of Vidzeme and is attacking the West Russian Volunteer Army, which is forced to retreat.

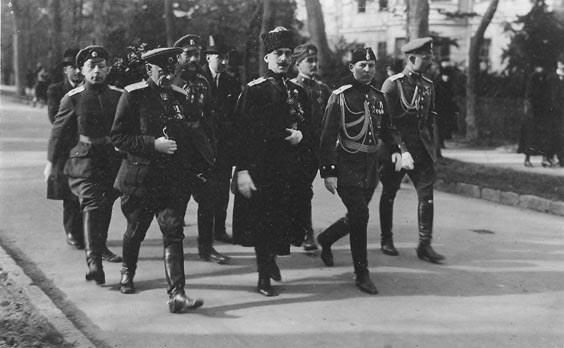
General Bermondt-Avalov accompanied by West Russian Volunteer Army officers, 1919

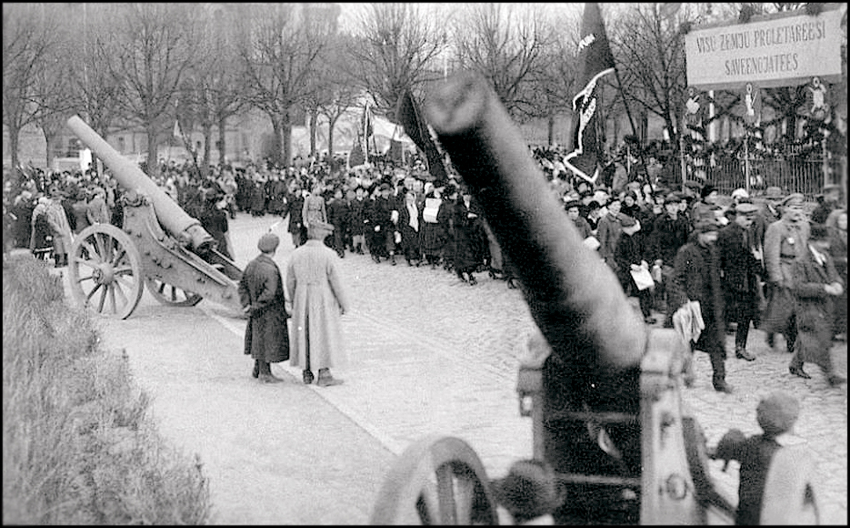
May Day demonstration in Soviet Latvian controlled Riga, 1919

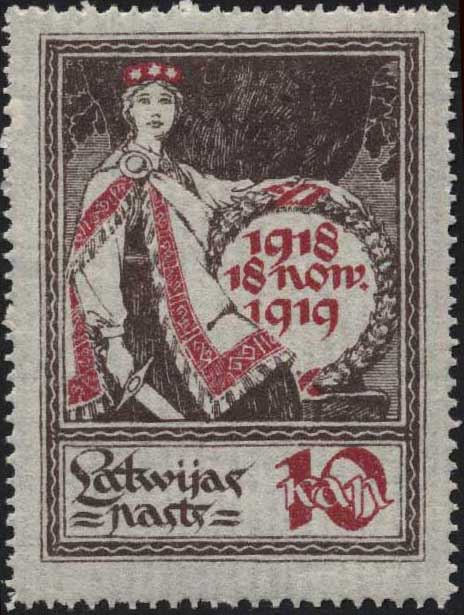
A 1919 stamp of Latvia marking the first anniversary of independence

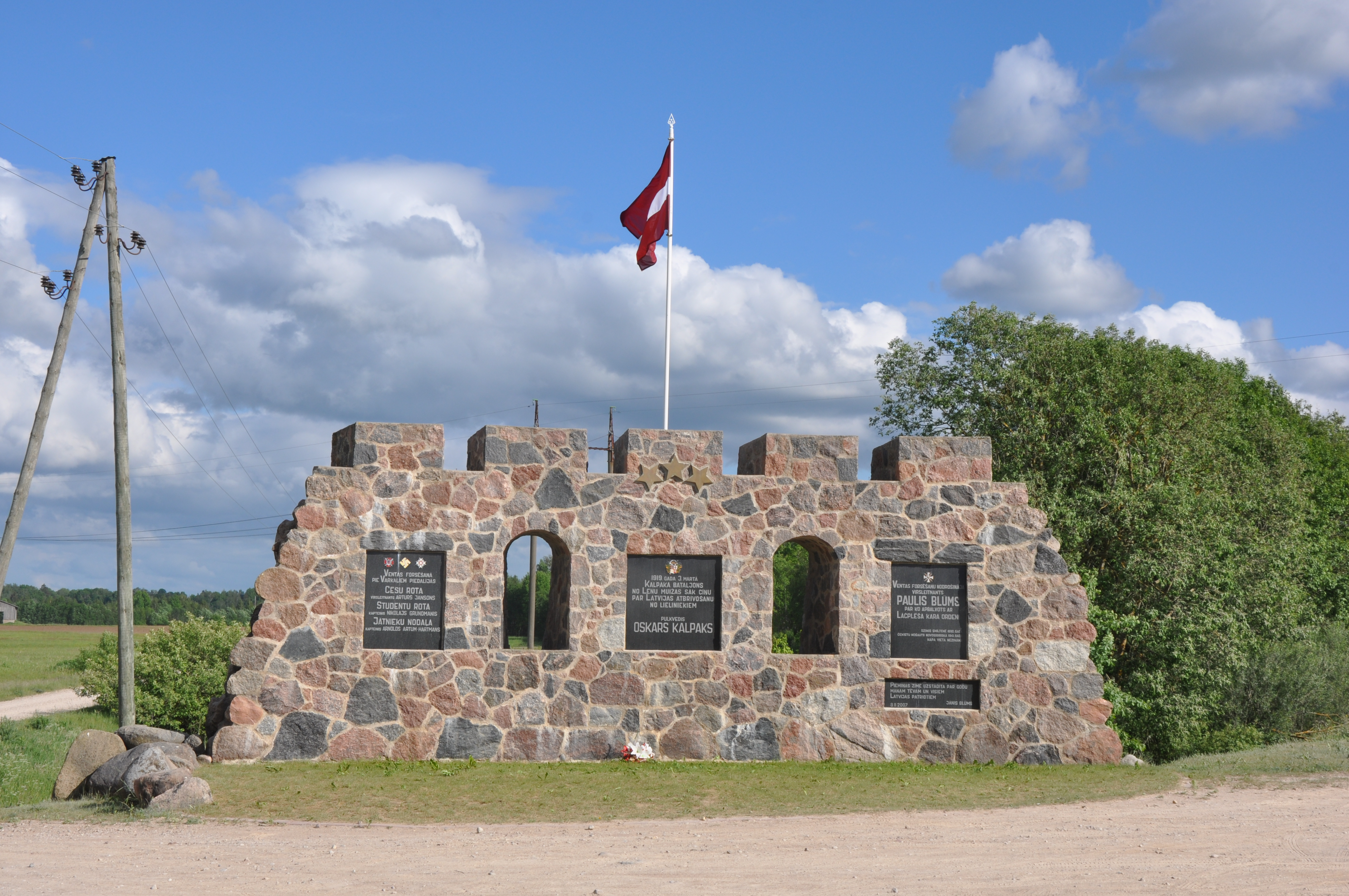
Memorial marking the location of the start of the advance of Latvian troops led by Oskars Kalpaks against Soviet forces in March 1919, Nīkrāce Parish

=== 1920 ===
- 3 January: The joint forces of Latvia and Poland launch an attack on the Bolsheviks in Latgale and take Daugavpils.
- 13 January: The government of the Latvian SSR announces its resignation.
- 1 February: Latvia signs a cease-fire with Soviet Russia.
- 17–18 April: Elections of the Constitutional Assembly of Latvia.
- 1 May: First session of the Constitutional Assembly.
- 15 July: Latvia signs a cease-fire with Germany.
- 11 August: The Latvian-Soviet Riga Peace Treaty is signed.
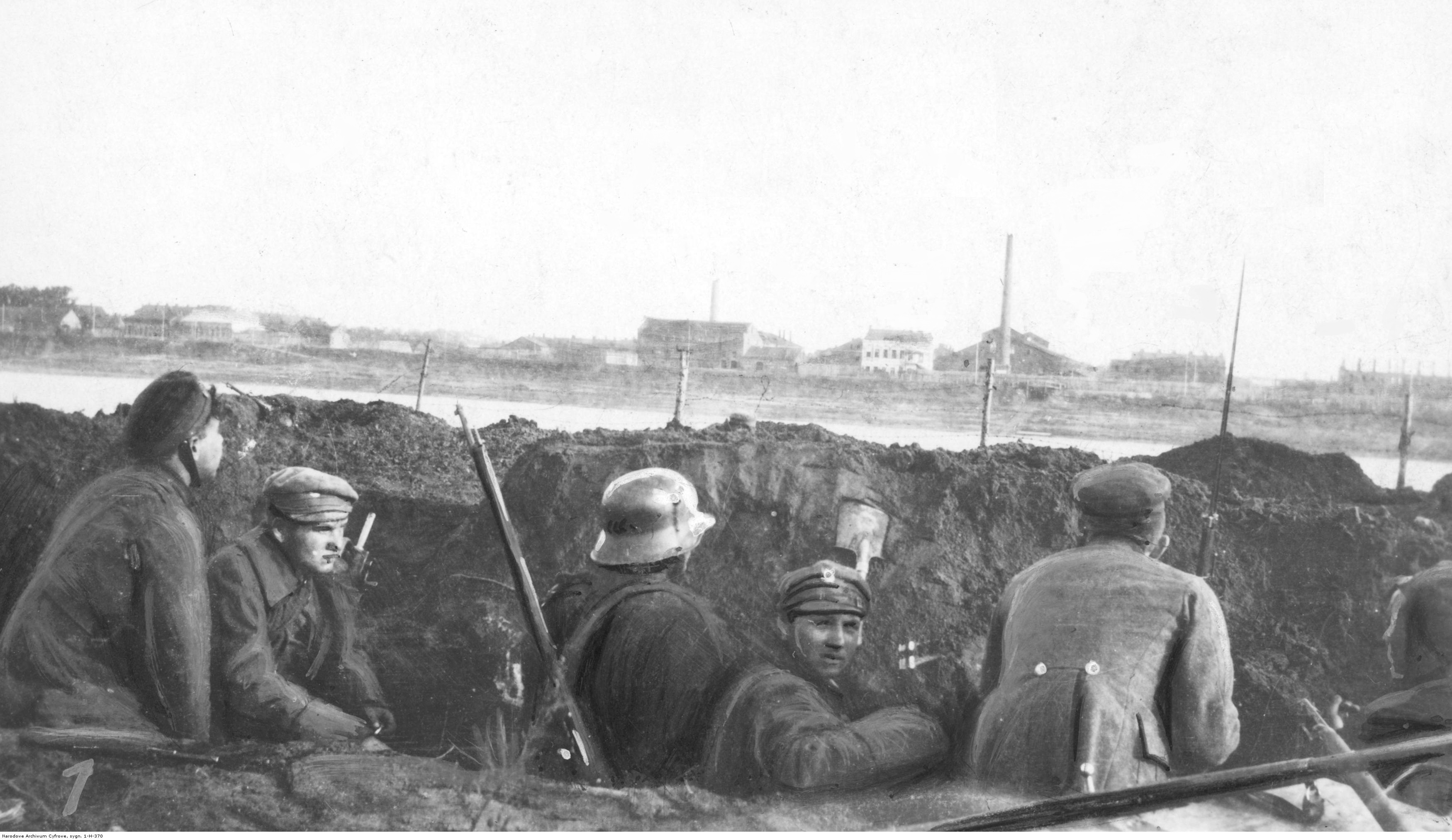
Soldiers of the Polish 1st Legions Infantry Division in treches on the left coast of the Daugava near Daugavpils, October 1919

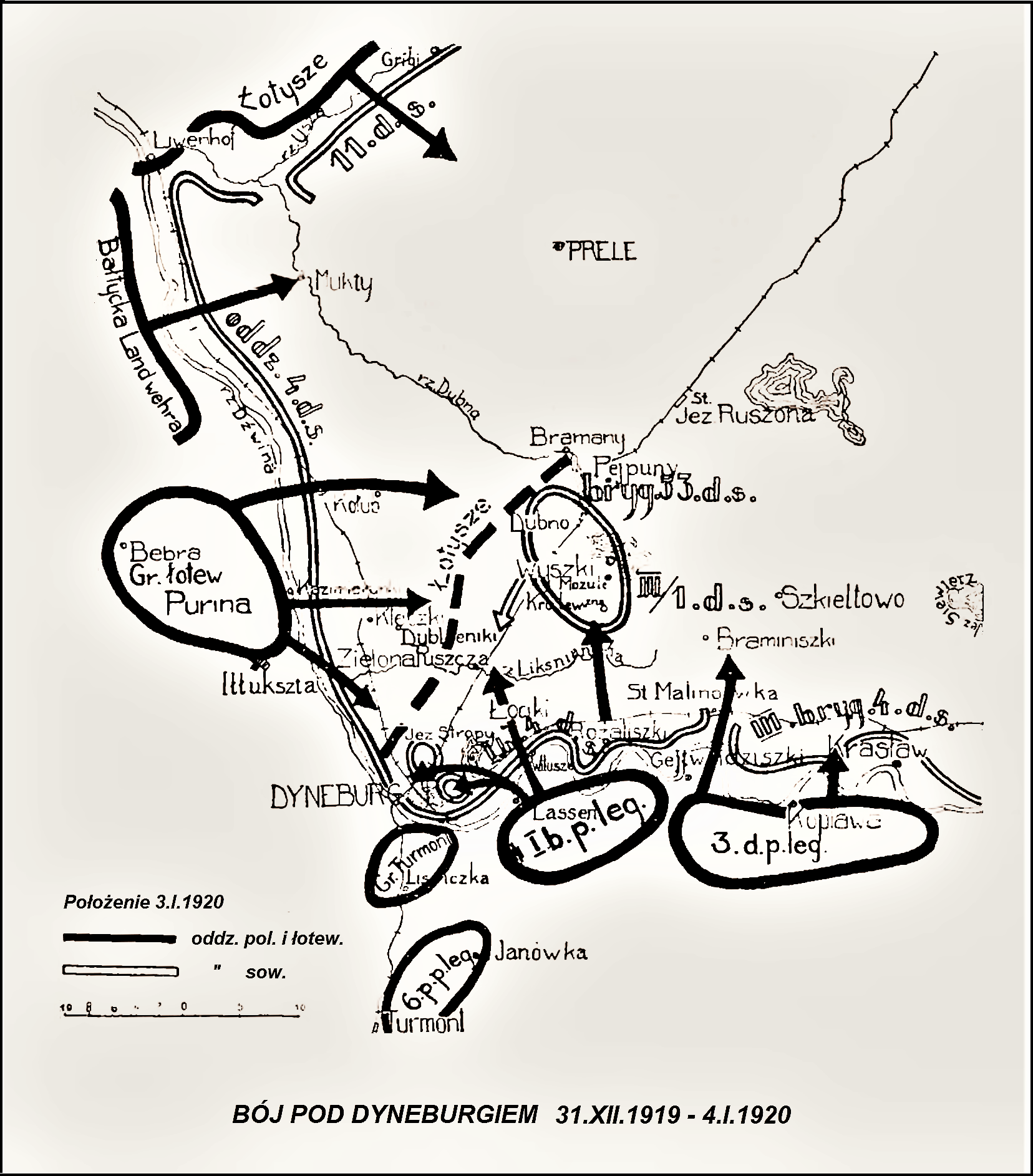
January 1920 action during the Battle of Daugavpils

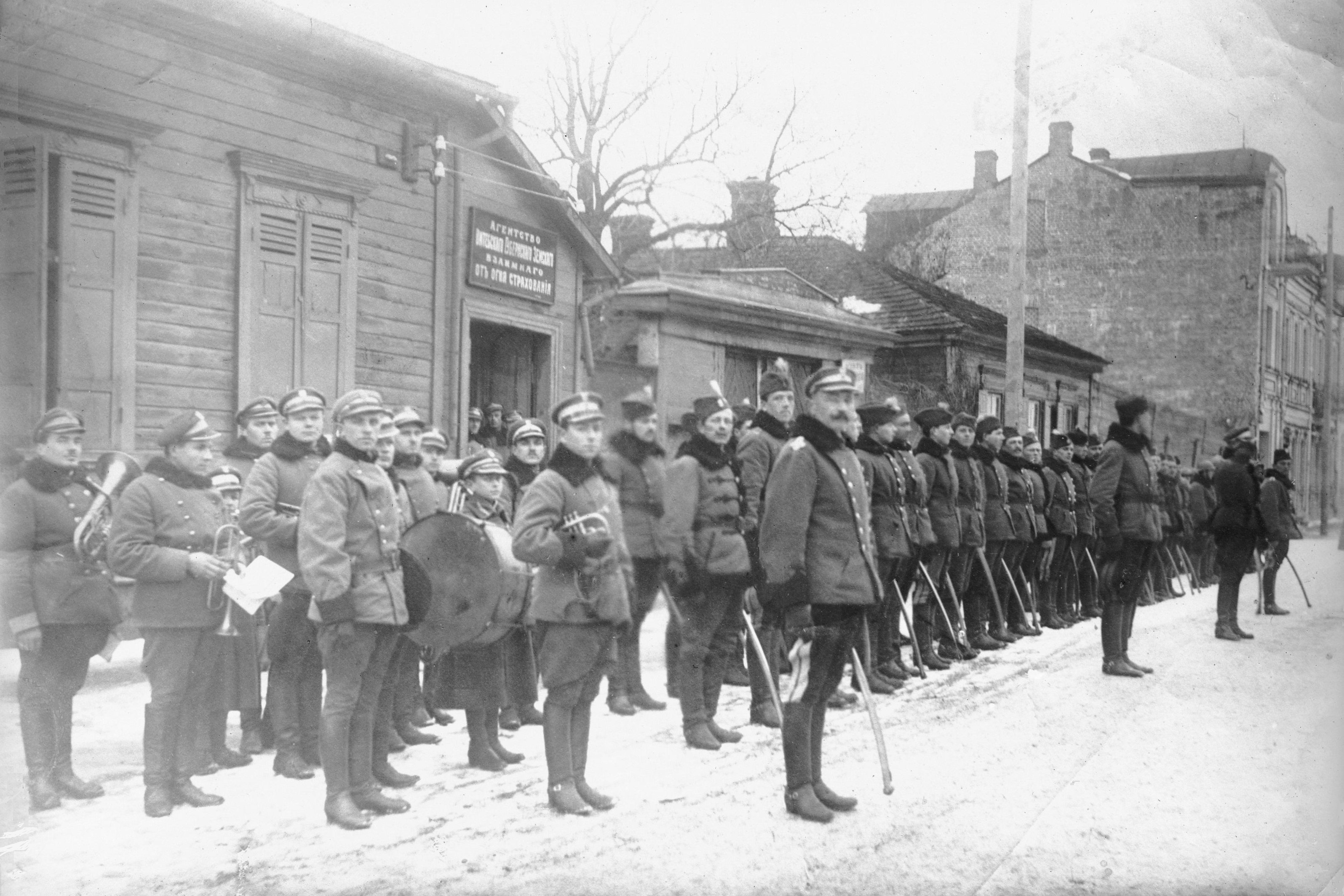
Polish troops in Daugavpils

== In fiction ==
=== Literature ===
- Blizzard of Souls, by Aleksandrs Grīns

=== Film ===
- Lāčplēsis (1930), directed by Aleksandrs Rusteiķis
- Defenders of Riga (2007), directed by Aigars Grauba
- Blizzard of Souls (2019), directed by Dzintars Dreibergs

== See also ==
- List of states and regions involved in the Russian Civil War
- Bibliography of the Russian Revolution and Civil War
- Outline of the Russian Revolution and Civil War
- Aftermath of World War I
- Freikorps in the Baltic
- West Russian Volunteer Army
- Estonian War of Independence
- Ukrainian War of Independence
- Lithuanian War of Independence
- United Baltic Duchy
- Ober Ost
- Political terror in Finland and Baltic States after World War I
- British campaign in the Baltic (1918–1919)

== Bibliography ==
- Gen. Fürst Awaloff (1925). Im Kampf gegen den Bolschewismus. Erinnerungen von General Fürst Awaloff, Oberbefehlshaber der Deutsch-Russischen Westarmee im Baltikum. Verlag von J.J. Augustin, Glückstadt und Hamburg.
- Gen. Graf Rüdiger von der Goltz (1920). Meine Sendung in Finland und im Baltikum. Verlag von K.F. Koehler, Leipzig.
- BischoffJosef, Die letzte Front. Geschichte der Eiserne Division im Baltikum 1919, Berlin 1935.
- Darstellungen aus den Nachkriegskämpfen deutscher Truppen und Freikorps, Bd 2: Der Feldzug im Baltikum bis zur zweiten Einnahme von Riga. Januar bis Mai 1919, Berlin 1937; Bd 3: Die Kämpfe im Baltikum nach der zweiten Einnahme von Riga. Juni bis Dezember 1919, Berlin 1938.
- Die baltische Landeswehr im Befreiungskampf gegen den Bolschevismus. Ein Gedenkbuch, herausgegeben vom baltischen Landeswehrein, Riga 1929.
- Kiewisz Leon, Sprawy łotewskie w bałtyckiej polityce Niemiec 1914–1919, Poznań 1970.
- Łossowski Piotr, Między wojną a pokojem. Niemieckie zamysły wojenne na wschodzie w obliczu traktatu wersalskiego. Marzec-kwiecień 1919, Warszawa 1976.
- Paluszyński Tomasz, Walka o niepodległość Łotwy 1914–1920, Warszawa 1999.
- Von den baltische Provinzen zu den baltischen Staaten. Beiträge zur Entstehungsgeschichte der Republiken Estland und Lettland, Bd I (1917–1918), Bd II (1919–1920), Marburg 1971, 1977.
- Claus Grimm: "Vor den Toren Europas – Geschichte der Baltischen Landeswehr" Hamburg 1963
