= Baltische Landeswehr =

United military formation of Baltic German forces in 1918–1920

- Flag associated with the Baltic Germans
- Active: November 1918 – January 1920
- Country: Courland, Livonia
- Allegiance: Baltic German authorities and the United Baltic Duchy
- Branch: Army
- Type: Composite military formation
- Role: Territorial defence
- Size: Approximately 10,500 at its peak
- Colours: Feldgrau
- Engagements: Estonian War of Independence; Latvian War of Independence

Commanders
- Notable commanders: Rüdiger von der Goltz; Alfred Fletcher; Harold Alexander

Insignia
- Identification symbol: Shoulder-strap piping in light blue and white

The Baltische Landeswehr ("Baltic Territorial Army"), commonly known in English as the Baltic Landwehr, was a unified armed force formed from Baltic German military formations associated with the Couronian and Livonian nobility during the aftermath of World War I. It was established on 7 December 1918 and existed as a unified force until 3 July 1919.

The Landeswehr participated in the Latvian War of Independence and fought against forces of the Estonian and Latvian national governments and their allies during the conflicts that followed the collapse of German authority in the Baltic region. Its formations also included Baltic German, Latvian, and other personnel, and its composition and political alignment changed during the course of the conflict.

The formation of the Landeswehr took place amid the political and military instability that followed the German Revolution of 1918 and the withdrawal of German forces from the Baltic region. Baltic German leaders sought to organize local military forces to protect their communities and political interests, while the newly established Baltic states sought to consolidate their independence. These competing objectives contributed to tensions and eventually to armed conflict between the Landeswehr and the forces of the emerging Latvian and Estonian states.

== Command structure ==
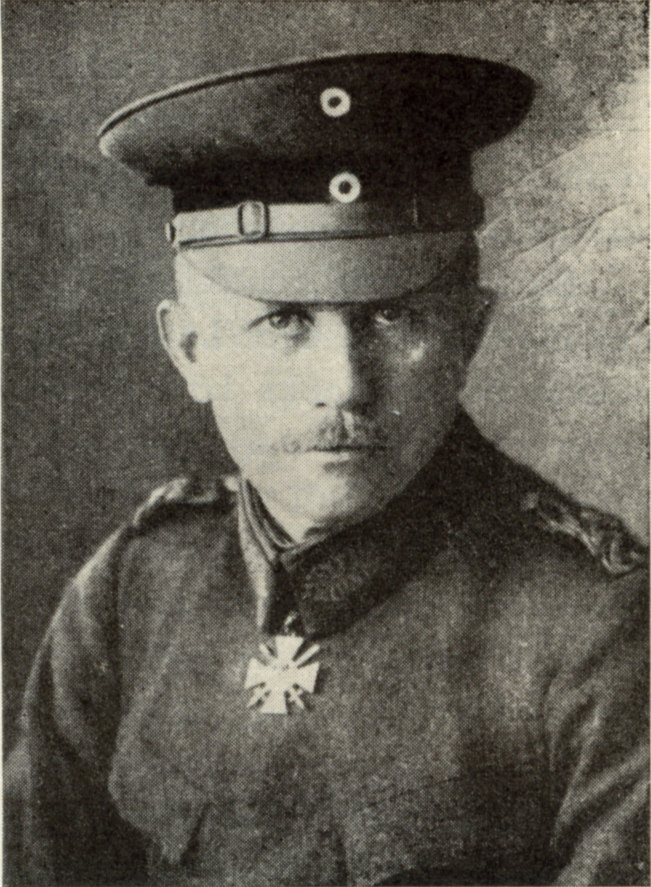
Rüdiger von der Goltz, Major-General

The Landeswehr was subordinated to the German VI Reserve Corps which Generalmajor Rüdiger von der Goltz (military governor of Libau in Latvia from 1 February 1919) commanded from 2 February 1919 until 12 October 1919. Major Alfred Fletcher and the British officer Lieutenant-Colonel Harold Alexander commanded the Landeswehr during its operations.

=== Commanders ===
- Major Emil von Scheibler (7 December 1918 – 6 February 1919)
- Major Alfred Fletcher (6 February – 3 July 1919)
- Lieutenant-Colonel Harold Alexander (British; July 1919)

== History ==
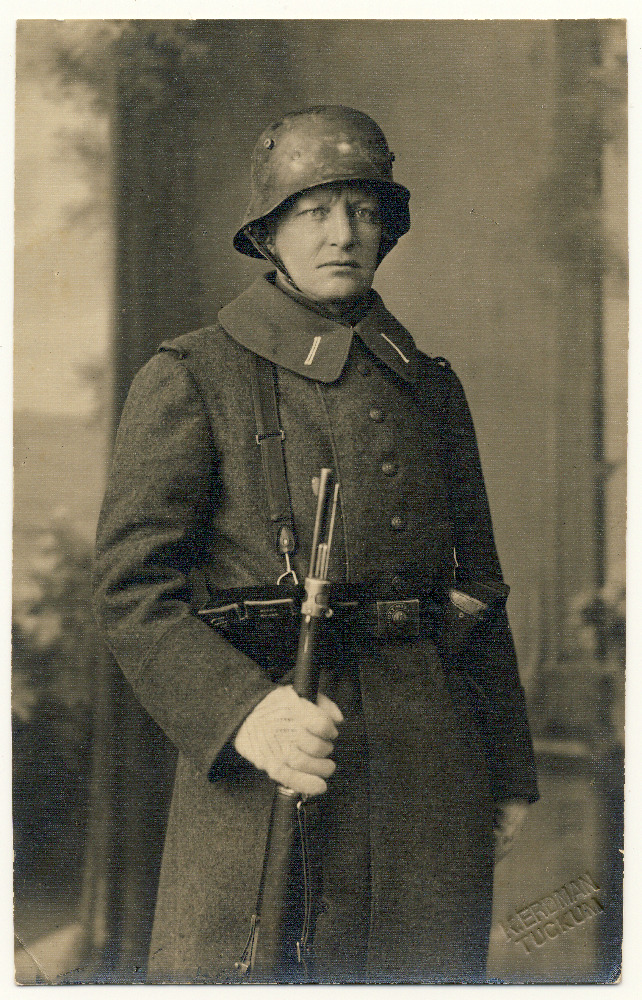
A member of the Baltic Landeswehr

After the November 11, 1918, armistice the Inter-Allied Commission of Control insisted that the German troops remain in the Baltic countries to prevent the region from being re-occupied by the Red Army. As the Soviet westward offensive approached, the Provisional Government of Latvia approached August Winnig, the German attorney in the Baltics, and signed an agreement with him authorising the organisation of land defense forces on 7 December 1918. The parties signed another agreement on 29 December which secured all foreign soldiers, who participated in the battles for the freedom of Latvia, full citizenship of Latvia. The arms, horse harness and uniforms were to be supplied by the state of Germany. The food supplies were to be taken care of by the Provisional Government of Latvia.

=== Theaters and campaigns ===
In late February 1919 only the seaport of Liepāja (Libau) and surroundings remained in the hands of the German and Latvian forces. In February and March 1919, the Landeswehr was able to win a series of victories over the Red Army, first occupying the port of Ventspils (Windau), and then advancing south and east towards Riga. The murder of three men of the Baltische Landeswehr led to the coup d'état of April 16, 1919, by the proclamation of the Government of a Lutheran clergyman, Andrievs Niedra. Parleys, in which the United States and the United Kingdom took part, did not prevent the advance on Riga and the capture of this city on May 22, where Baron Hans von Manteuffel-Szoege made an entry with a small detachment, and died leading his men. Latvian national government was deposed while the Freikorps moved on to capture Riga on May 23, 1919. Latvians sought assistance from the Estonian Army which had been occupying Northern Latvia since earlier that year. After the Bolsheviks had been driven out from most of Latvia, the Allies ordered the German government to withdraw its troops from the Baltic region. However, the Germans succeeded in negotiating a postponement, arguing that this would have given the Bolsheviks a free hand. In June 1919, General von der Goltz ordered his troops not to advance east against the Red Army, as the Allies had been expecting, but north, against the Estonians. On June 19, the Landeswehr launched an attack to capture areas around Cēsis (Wenden), however in the battles over the following few days they were defeated by the Estonian 3rd Division, including the Latvian 2nd Cesis regiment, led by Ernst Põdder. On the morning of June 23, the Germans began a general retreat toward Riga. The Allies again insisted that the Germans withdraw their remaining troops from Latvia and intervened to impose a ceasefire between the Estonians and the Landeswehr when the Estonians were about to march into Riga. In the meantime, an Allied mission composed of British troops under General Sir Hubert de la Poer Gough had arrived in the Baltic with the task of clearing the Germans from the region and organizing native armies for the Baltic States. To ensure its return to Latvian control, the Baltische Landeswehr was placed under British authority.

=== Subsequent ===
After taking command of the Baltische Landeswehr in mid-July 1919, Lieutenant-Colonel Harold Alexander (the future Field Marshal the Earl Alexander of Tunis and Governor-General of Canada, 1946–1952) gradually dismissed German nationals born within the borders of Imperial Germany.

The Germans released from the Baltische Landeswehr were incorporated into the Deutsche Legion in September 1919. The legion served under the West Russian Volunteer Army commanded by Colonel Prince Pavel Bermondt-Avalov in his attempt to capture Riga, but suffered complete defeat by the end of November 1919.

The British insisted that General von der Goltz leave Latvia, and he turned his troops over to Bermondt-Avalov's West Russian Volunteer Army. General von der Goltz later claimed in his memoirs that his major strategic goal in 1919 had been to launch a campaign in cooperation with the white Russian forces to overturn the Bolshevik regime by marching on Saint Petersburg and to install a pro-German government in Russia.

The purged Baltische Landeswehr units subsequently assisted in the liberation of Latgale from Bolsheviks together with Latvian and Polish armies in January 1920.

== Prominent members ==
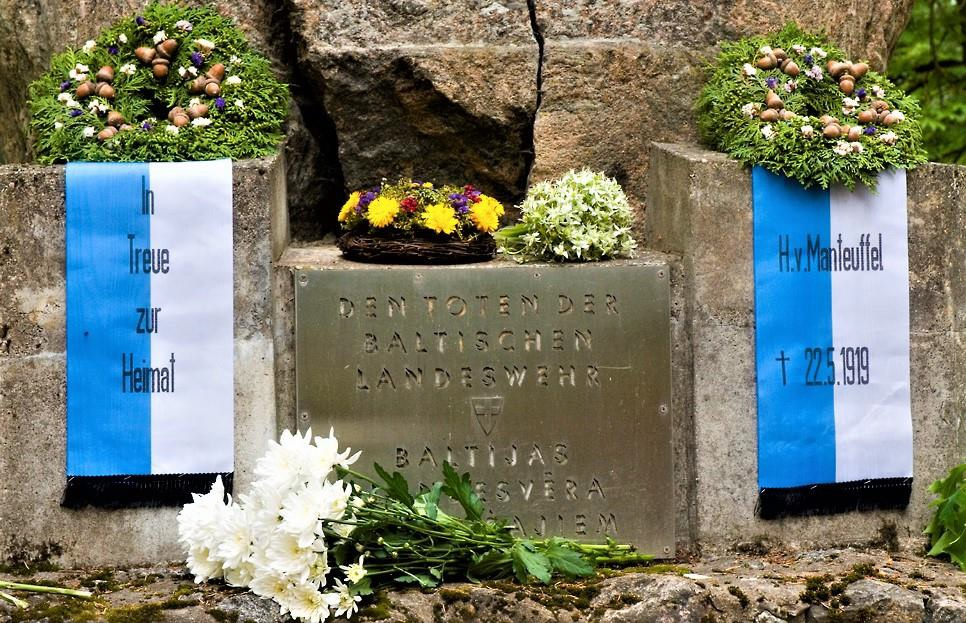
German Landeswehr memorial, Forest Cemetery, Riga

Prominent Baltic officers from the Landeswehr era include:

- Generalmajor Erich Alt (Luftwaffe) (leader of the 1. Baltischen Flieger-Abteilung (433))
- Generalmajor Rudolf Bader (in the Badisches Freiwilligen Abteilung Medem)
- Generalmajor Heinrich Baron von Behr
- Generalmajor z.V. Heinrich Burggraf und Graf zu Dohna-Schlobitten
- Generalmajor Karl Dormagen
- Generalmajor Dipl. Ing. Hans Henrici
- General der Artillerie Kurt Jahn
- Generalleutnant Heinrich Rauch (Luftwaffe) (aerial observer in Flieger-Abteilung 433)
- Oberst (Colonel) Wessel Freytag von Loringhoven

(the ranks are the highest ranks reached in the Third Reich era)

== Rank insignia ==
Members of the Baltische Landeswehr wore shoulder strap piping in light blue and white, the Baltic colors.

Commissioned officers

Rank group	Field/senior officers		Junior officers
Baltische Landeswehr
Baltische Landeswehr	Befehlshaber	Kommandeur; Major	Rittmeister	Kornett	Fähnrich

Enlisted personnel

Rank group	NCOs			Other ranks
Baltische Landeswehr
Baltische Landeswehr	Wachtmeister	Oberfeldmeister	Feldmeister	Gefreiter	Soldat

== Order of battle (20 May 1919) ==
- 1. Deutsch-Balt. Kampfbataillon (Stoßtrupp Manteuffel; Baron Hans von Manteuffel)
- 2. Deutsch-Balt. Kampfbataillon (Hauptmann Malmede)
- 3. Deutsch-Balt. Kampfbataillon (Rittmeister Graf zu Eulenburg)
- MG-Scharfschützen-Abteilung (Hauptmann Freiherr von Khaynach)
- Russische Abteilung Fürst Lieven (Cavalry Captain Prince Anatolii Pavlovich Liven or, in German, Fürst Anatol Leonid Lieven)
- Lettische Kampf-Brigade (Colonel Jānis Balodis)
- Stamm-Kompanie Talssen
- Stamm-Kompanie Tuckum
- Balten-Kompanie des Gouvernement Libau
- Elements of the MG-Kompanie of III./Freiwilligen-Regiment Libau (Gouvernement Libau)
- Lettische Kavallerie-Abteilung
- Russische Kavallerie-Abteilung
- Kavallerie-Abteilung Engelhardt
- Kavallerie-Abteilung Drachenfels
- Kavallerie-Abteilung Pappenheim
- Kavallerie-Abteilung Halm
- 1. Deutsch-Balt. Batterie (Ehmke)
- 2. Deutsch-Balt. Batterie (Barth)
- 3. Deutsch-Balt. Batterie (Sievert)
- Deutsch-Balt. Haubitze-Batterie
- Russische Batterie (Röhl)
- Badisches Freiwilligen Abteilung Medem (attached Korpstruppe)
- Lettische Pionier-Kompanie
- Pionier-Abteilung Stromberg
- Balt. Fernsprech-Abteilung
- Lettische Fernsprech-Abteilung
- Balt. Funker-Abteilung
- Flieger-Abteilung 433 (attached Korpstruppe)
- Armee-Kraftwagen-Kolonne 021 (attached Korpstruppe)
- Staffel-Stab der Landeswehr (Major Wölki)
  - Munitions- und Train-Kolonne I
  - Munitions- und Train-Kolonne II
  - Landeskolonne III
- Feldlazarett
- Sanitäts-Kompanie
- Sanitäts-Kraftwagen-Zug
- Wirtschafts-Kompanie 1
- Wirtschafts-Kompanie 2
- Bahnschutz-Detachement
- Pferdelazarett
- Sammeldepot Libau

== See also ==
- Aftermath of World War I
- Bundeswehr
- Estonian War of Independence
- Freikorps in the Baltic
- German Army (German Empire)
- Latvian Riflemen
- Latvian War of Independence
- Ober Ost
- Reichswehr
- United Baltic Duchy
- Wehrmacht

== Bibliography ==
- Goltz Rüdiger von der, Meine Sendung im Finland und im Baltikum, Leipzig 1920.
- Goltz Rüdiger von der, Minu missioon Soomes ja Baltikumis, Tartu, Loodus 1937; faksiimiletrükk Tallinn, Olion 2004. ISBN 9985-66-379-9.
- Bermond-Awaloff Pavel, Im Kampf gegen den Bolschevismus. Erinnerungen von..., Berlin 1925.
- BischoffJosef, Die letzte Front. Geschichte der Eiserne Division im Baltikum 1919, Berlin 1935.
- Darstellungen aus den Nachkriegskämpfen deutscher Truppen und Freikorps, Bd 2: Der Feldzug im Baltikum bis zur zweiten Einnahme von Riga. Januar bis Mai 1919, Berlin 1937; Bd 3: Die Kämpfe im Baltikum nach der zweiten Einnahme von Riga. Juni bis Dezember 1919, Berlin 1938.
- Die Baltische Landeswehr im Befreiungskampf gegen den Bolschewismus, Riga 1929.
- Eesti Vabadussõda 1918–1920, Tallinn, Mats, 1997. ISBN 9985-51-028-3.
- Kiewisz Leon, Sprawy łotewskie w bałtyckiej polityce Niemiec 1914–1919, Poznań 1970.
- Łossowski Piotr, Między wojną a pokojem. Niemieckie zamysły wojenne na wschodzie w obliczu traktatu wersalskiego. Marzec-kwiecień 1919, Warszawa 1976.
- Paluszyński Tomasz, Walka o niepodległość Łotwy 1914–1920, Warszawa 1999.
- Von den baltische Provinzen zu den baltischen Staaten. Beiträge zur Entstehungsgeschichte der Republiken Estland und Lettland, Bd I (1917–1918), Bd II (1919–1920), Marburg 1971, 1977.
