= Jānis Balodis =

Latvian military personnel and politician

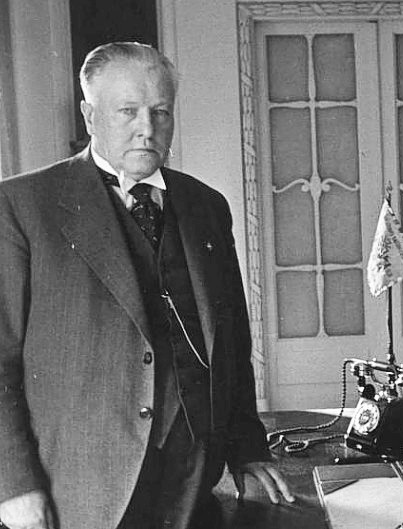
- Jānis Balodis
- Born: 20 February 1881; Trikāta Parish, Kreis Walk, Governorate of Livonia
- Died: 8 August 1965 (aged 84); Saulkrasti, Latvian SSR, Soviet Union
- Burial place: Riga
- Military career
- Allegiance: Russian Empire (1898–1917); Latvia (1918–1921)
- Branch: Imperial Russian Army; Latvian Army
- Service years: 1898–1921
- Rank: General
- Conflicts: Russo-Japanese War; First World War; Latvian War of Independence
- Awards: Order of Lāčplēsis

Jānis Balodis (20 February 1881 – 8 August 1965) was an army general, Commander-in-Chief of the Armed Forces of Latvia (1919–1921), Minister of War (1931–1940), and a politician who was one of the principal figures during the Latvian War of Independence and the dictatorship of Kārlis Ulmanis, when he was officially the number two of the regime as the Minister of War, Deputy Prime Minister and Vice President.

== Early life and education ==
Jānis Balodis father was historian and teacher Voldemārs Balodis. In 1898, he joined the Imperial Russian Army and served in Kaunas. From 1900 until 1902 he studied at the Vilnius War School.

== Military service ==
=== Russo-Japanese War and World War I ===
From November 1904 until July 1905, he participated in the Russo–Japanese War and was seriously wounded in the arm. From 1906 until 1914, Balodis served in Vilnius. At the beginning of World War I he was lightly wounded during the battles in East Prussia, for which he received a number of decorations. On 20 February 1915, while recuperating in hospital, he was captured by the German Army and spent the rest of the war in a POW camp in Silesia.

=== Latvian partisan ===
Balodis returned to Latvia immediately after the end of World War I in November 1918, and joined the first armed units of the newly established Republic of Latvia on 18 December 1918. When Riga was threatened by the advancing Red Army, Balodis retreated from Riga together with the army and the government on 3 January 1919. On 26 February 1919, he was promoted to the rank of lieutenant colonel. After the death of Oskars Kalpaks on 6 March 1919, he was further promoted to the rank of colonel and took control of the few Latvian soldiers in Courland. During the spring of 1919, after a string of victories over the Red Army, Balodis was given command over larger units and eventually over the Southern Group of the armed forces. In this role he was forced into an uneasy alliance with German troops. In the second half of 1919, Balodis led the 1st Courland division in battles against the Red Army in Latgale.

During the panic that followed the sudden attack of the West Russian Volunteer Army (Bermontians), Balodis was appointed the Commander-in-Chief on 16 October 1919. After the victory over the Bermontians, Balodis was promoted to general status on 23 January 1920.

== Political career ==
After the conclusion of the Latvian War of Independence, the post of Commander-in-Chief was abolished in February 1921 and in July of the same year, Balodis asked to be discharged from the army. By a special law of the Saeima, he was presented with 100 hectares of land and a manor house. He joined the Latvian Farmers Union, the largest party at the time, which was led by Kārlis Ulmanis. Balodis was elected to the Saeima in 1925, but played only a secondary role in politics. On 7 December 1931, he became the Minister of War, a post he held until 5 April 1940.

Beginning in July 1933, Balodis held frequent talks with Kārlis Ulmanis about the need for the end of the multi-party system in Latvia. As the Minister of War, he played a crucial role in organizing the Latvian coup d'état on 15 May 1934, and together with Prime Minister Kārlis Ulmanis, was one of two signatories of the proclamation by which martial law was declared and the Saeima dissolved.

During the following years of authoritarian, corporatist rule, Balodis could always be found next to Ulmanis, creating a perception of duumvirate, while in reality, his role was limited to military matters. On 12 March 1936, he became Vice President, and on 11 February 1938, became Deputy Prime Minister.

After the signing of the Soviet–Latvian Mutual Assistance Treaty on 5 October 1939, Latvia became a virtual protectorate of the Soviet Union without a shot being fired. Tensions within the ruling circles increased to the point where on 5 April 1940, Balodis was relieved of all his posts without a clear official explanation.

== Soviet occupation of Latvia, imprisonment ==
Shortly after the Soviet occupation of Latvia in 1940, Balodis was arrested on 31 July 1940 together with his wife and deported to Syzran, where they were kept under house arrest. After the start of German–Soviet war in 1941, they were deported to Kuibishev. Only in 1952 was he formally tried and sentenced to a prison sentence of 25 years to be served in a jail in Vladimir.

== Release, retirement, and death ==
With the beginning of the de-Stalinization in 1956, he was released and allowed to return to Latvia. He and his wife received a small apartment in Riga and spent some time living in a summer house in Saulkrasti. In early August 1965, his health failed and he died on 8 August. General Balodis was buried in Riga. His widow managed to install a tombstone with a sword and the inscription "General Balodis" which was removed by KGB.

== Military orders, medals and awards ==
- Order of St. Stanislaus, 2nd class with swords, 1914.
- Order of St. Vladimir, 4th class with swords, 1915.
- Order of St. Anna, 2nd class with swords.
- Order of Lāčplēsis, 3rd, 2nd and 1st class.
- Order of the Three Stars, 1st class, 1929.
- Order of Viesturs, 1st class with swords, 1938.
- Aizsargi Cross of Merit.
- Commandeur of France's Legion of Honour.
- Britain's Order of St Michael and St George.
- Order of the White Rose of Finland, 1st class.
- Estonia's Cross of Liberty, 1st class of Grade 1, 1921.
- Estonia's Order of the Cross of the Eagle, 1st class, 1932.
- Poland's Virtuti Militari, 5th class.
- Lithuania's Order of Vytautas the Great.
- Italy's Order of Saints Maurice and Lazarus, 1st class.

== See also ==
- Latvian War of Independence
- Freikorps in the Baltic
- West Russian Volunteer Army
- List of Latvian Army generals

== Sources ==
- Encyclopædia Britannica
- Balodis Jānis, General
- Vilis Lācis handwritten note (facsimile and translation) deporting Balodis and his family
