= Ernst Põdder =

Estonian military commander

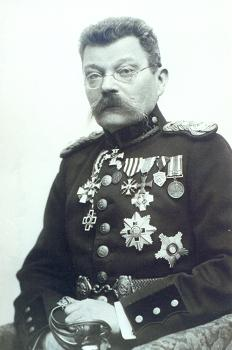
- Born: 10 February [O.S. 29 January] 1879; Tartu (Dorpat), Estonia, Russian Empire
- Died: 24 June 1932 (aged 53); Tallinn, Estonia
- Military career
- Allegiance: Russian Empire (1897–1917); Estonia (1918–1932)
- Branch: Imperial Russian Army; Estonian Army
- Service years: 1897–1932
- Rank: Kindralmajor
- Nickname: Vana Õkva
- Conflicts: Russo-Japanese War; First World War; Estonian War of Independence; Battle of Cēsis
- Awards: Cross of Liberty; Order of Lāčplēsis (Latvia)

Ernst-Johannes Põdder VR I/1 (10 February 1879 – 24 June 1932) was an Estonian military commander in the 1918–1920 Estonian War of Independence.

In 1900, Põdder graduated from the Vilnius Military Academy. In the Russo-Japanese War he achieved the rank of Lieutenant, and in World War I became polkovnik (Colonel). In July 1917 he joined the Estonian national units as commander of the 3rd and 1st Estonian regiments. In 1918 Põdder was promoted to the rank of Major General. During the German occupation of 1918, he was one of the main founders of the underground Defence League. At the beginning of the Estonian Liberation War, Põdder was Chief of Internal Security. On April 4, 1919, he became Commander of the 3rd Division, where his main achievement was a victory over the Baltische Landeswehr.

After the war, Põdder commanded the 3rd Division and, after 1921, the 2nd Division. He actively participated in defeating the 1924 Estonian coup attempt. In 1926, he became a permanent member of the war council, as well as an active organizer of the Scout Movement in Estonia. Ernst Põdder was the only honorary member of the League of Liberators. Põdder was a recipient of the Latvian military Order of Lāčplēsis, 2nd class.

== See also ==
- Estonian War of Independence
- Battle of Wenden
- Freikorps in the Baltic
