= Military Inter-Allied Commission of Control =

Post-World War 1 group responsible for monitoring the defeated Central Powers

The term Military Inter-Allied Commission of Control was used in a series of peace treaties concluded after the First World War (1914–1918) between different countries. Each of these treaties was concluded between the Principal Allied and Associated Powers (consisting of the United States, the British Empire, France, Italy and Japan) on the one hand, and one of the Central Powers like Germany, Austria-Hungary, Turkey or Bulgaria.

One of the terms of such treaties required conversion of all of the Central Powers' military and armaments related production and related facilities into purely commercial use. The decision and the modus operandi to ensure this rested with a Military Inter-Allied Commission of Control. The Military Inter-Allied Commission of Control was also entrusted with a number of other responsibilities, including:

1. to fix the number of customs officials, local urban and rural police, forest guards and other like officials under the control of the Government of the central power concerned.
2. to receive from the central power concerned information relating to the location of the stocks and depots of munitions, the armament of the fortified works, fortresses and forts, the situation of the works or factories for the production of arms, munitions and war material and their operations.

The commission of control ceased to function in Germany on 28 February 1927, in Hungary on 31 March and in Bulgaria on 1 June.
