= Freikorps in the Baltic =

Anti-communist paramilitary organizations of Germany in Baltic states

Flag of the Iron Division. The words mean roughly "and yet".

The Freikorps in the Baltic were German paramilitary units that formed after the German Empire's defeat in World War I. Their aim was to prevent the advance of the Soviet Red Army into the Baltic states and preserve a German presence there. The two primary units were the Eiserne Division ("Iron Division") and the Baltische Landeswehr ("Baltic Defence Force"). After initially defeating the Red Army with the help of Latvian and Estonian forces, the Allied Powers ordered the withdrawal of German soldiers from the Baltics. The German Freikorps forces then attempted to seize control of Latvia with the assistance of the local ethnic German population. They captured Riga but were driven back. Following intervention by the Allies on 3 July 1919, the Freikorps in the Baltic retreated to Germany.

== 1917: Russia cedes the Baltic lands to Germany ==
The Russian Bolsheviks ceded the Baltic areas to Germany under the Treaty of Brest-Litovsk of 3 March 1918. The Imperial German government established occupation governments in Estonia and Latvia and formally recognised the independence of a puppet government in Lithuania on March 24, 1918. The German Ober Ost occupation-authorities under the command of Prince Leopold of Bavaria favored the Baltic Germans, who had been the most dominant local ethnic group socially, economically, and politically in Courland, Livonia, and Estonia. On March 8 1918 the local Baltic German-dominated Land Council of Courland proclaimed the Duchy of Courland an independent state; on April 12, 1918, the United Land Council of Livonia, Estonia, Riga and Ösel followed suit, establishing the Baltic State (German: Baltischer Staat). Each of these new states proclaimed themselves to be in personal union with Prussia, although the German government never responded and acknowledged that claim.

Kaiser Wilhelm II of Germany nominally recognized the Baltic lands as a sovereign state on September 22, 1918, half a year after Soviet Russia had formally relinquished all authority over its former Imperial Baltic provinces in the Treaty of Brest-Litovsk. On November 5, 1918, a temporary Regency Council (Regentschaftsrat) for the United Baltic Duchy, led by Baron Adolf Pilar von Pilchau, was formed on a joint basis from the two local Land Councils.

== 1918: Germany loses World War I, Red Army threatens ==
Under the terms of the November 11, 1918 Armistice the German Army was required to withdraw its troops from all other countries on a timetable established by the Allied Control Commission. As elsewhere, pro-socialist Soldiers' Councils controlled many German troop units in the Baltic area, but the Allied Control Commission insisted that the German troops remain to prevent the region from occupation by the Russian Red Army. The Red Army, led by the Latvian Riflemen, was making serious inroads into Estonia and Latvia. The Estonians offered tough resistance to the Red Army and refused to ask for, or accept, German Army support. Instead, Scandinavian soldiers from Finland, Sweden and Denmark came to their support. The Estonians, with this help and naval support from the British, were able to prevail over the Red Army after a year-long fight.

Meanwhile, the People's Council of Latvia proclaimed Latvia's independence from Russia on November 18, 1918. Latvian leader Kārlis Ulmanis requested German Freikorps support for assistance against the Bolsheviks. The British observer, General Sir Hubert Gough, invoked Article 12 of the Armistice Agreement, which provided that German troops must evacuate all territories belonging to the Russian Empire, but only "as soon as the Allies shall consider this desirable, having regard to the interior conditions of these territories."

== 1919: Iron Brigade ==
Wonderful Settlement Opportunity! Anyone who wants to own his own estate in the beautiful Baltic, report to one of the following recruitment offices....

— Advert in a newspaper for German soldiers, 1919 (quoted in Waite's Vanguard of Nazism)

As many of the demoralized German soldiers were being withdrawn from Latvia, Major Josef Bischoff, an experienced German officer, formed a Freikorps unit called the Eiserne Brigade (translated: "Iron Brigade"). This unit was deployed to Riga and used to delay the Red Army advance. Meanwhile, volunteers were recruited from Germany, with promises of land, a chance to fight Bolshevism, and other enticements of dubious veracity. These soldiers, along with remnants of the German 8th Army and the Eiserne Brigade, were reconstituted into the Eiserne (Iron) Division. Also, the Baltic Germans and some Latvians formed the Baltische Landeswehr. The official mission assigned to this force was to prevent any Red Army advance into East Prussia, but its real mission was to help the Baltic Germans re-establish their own state or dominance in Latvia.

Initially, the Iron Division was commanded by Bischoff, and the Baltische Landeswehr by Major Alfred Fletcher, a German of Scottish ancestry. In late February, only the seaport of Liepāja and its surroundings remained in the hands of the German and Latvian forces. In March 1919, the Iron Brigade helped the German detachments win a series of victories over the Red forces. The main blow in the campaign was delivered by the Baltische Landeswehr, which first occupied the port of Ventspils and then drove south to Riga. This attack appears to have been coordinated with the Estonians who drove the Bolsheviks from the northern part of Latvia.

The Allies ordered the German government to withdraw its troops from the Baltic after the defeat of Bolsheviks. The German forces attempted to seize control of Latvia with the assistance of the local ethnic German population. On April 16, they organised a coup d'état in Liepāja, the provisional national government of Latvia took refuge aboard steamship Saratow. A new puppet government headed by Pastor Andrievs Niedra was proclaimed. Pastor Niedra was a Latvian Lutheran minister with pro-German sympathies. The Germans convinced the British to postpone the withdrawal of the German Freikorps units because this would give the Bolsheviks a free hand. Britain backed down after recognizing the gravity of the military situation, and the Freikorps moved on and captured Riga on May 23, 1919.

== Conflict with Estonia and Latvia ==
We were a band of fighters drunk with all the passions of the world; full of lust, exultant in action. What we wanted, we did not know. And what we knew, we did not want! War and adventure, excitement and destruction. An indefinable, surging force welled up from every part of our being and flayed us onward.

— Ernst von Salomon, The Outlaws (Die Geächteten), quoted in Waite's Vanguard of Nazism

After the capture of Riga, the Freikorps were accused of killing 300 Latvians in Jelgava, 200 in Tukums, 125 in Daugavgrīva, and over 3,000 in Riga. The Latvian nationalists had turned against the German Freikorps and sought assistance from the Estonian troops who had occupied Latvian territory north of the Daugava River. The German forces advanced north towards the Latvian city of Cēsis. The objective of the German forces had now clearly become the establishment of German supremacy in the Baltic by eliminating the Estonian military and Latvian national units, not the defeat of the Bolsheviks. The Estonian commander General Johan Laidoner insisted the Germans withdraw to a line south of the Gauja river. He also ordered the Estonian 3rd division to seize the Gulbene railroad station.

On June 19, 1919, the Landeswehr and the Iron Division launched an attack to capture Cēsis. Initially, the Freikorps captured the town of Straupe and continued their advance toward the town of Limbaži. The Estonians launched a counterattack and drove the Freikorps out of the town. On June 21, the Estonians received reinforcements and immediately attacked the Landeswehr under Fletcher, who was forced to withdraw from an area to the northeast of Cēsis. The Iron Division attacked from Straupe towards Stalbe in an effort to relieve pressure on the Landeswehr. On the morning of June 23, the Germans began a general retreat toward Riga.

The Allies again insisted that the Germans withdraw their remaining troops from Latvia, and on July 3 intervened to impose a Strazdumuiža armistice between Estonia, Latvia, and the Landeswehr and Freikorps when the Latvians and Estonians were about to march into Riga. Major Bischoff created a German Legion from over a dozen Freikorps units and turned the units over to the West Russian Volunteer Army. In all, the Iron Division transferred over 14,000 men, 64 aircraft, 56 artillery pieces, and 156 machine guns. Six cavalry units and a field hospital also went over. The offensive by the reformed German army was subsequently defeated by the Latvian Army, which received assistance from British and French warships and Estonian armoured trains.

== Retreat ==
The Freikorps had saved Latvia from capture by the Red Army in the spring of 1919. However, their goal of creating a German-dominated state in Courland and Livonia failed. Many of the German Freikorps members who served in the Baltics left Latvia with the belief that they had been "stabbed in the back" by the Weimar Republic, under President Friedrich Ebert. Hundreds of Baltic Freikorps soldiers had planned to settle in Latvia, and for those who had fought there, the land made a lasting impression, and many of them longed for the day that they could return there. The Baltic Freikorps characterized their struggle against the Reds as the "Drang nach Osten", (the drive towards the East), and some Freikorps units returned to Germany and planned for the day of their return.

According to historian Robert GL Waite, the retreat from the Baltic caused discipline in the Freikorps to break down, and many fighters "ran wild through the country side marauding in complete disorder".

Some Freikorps members, like Otto Zeltiņš-Goldfelds, stayed in Latvia, joined the Latvian Army and became citizens.

== See also ==
- List of states and regions involved in the Russian Civil War
- Bibliography of the Russian Revolution and Civil War
- Outline of the Russian Revolution and Civil War
- West Russian Volunteer Army
- Aftermath of World War I
- Latvian Riflemen
- Latvian War of Independence
- Estonian War of Independence
- United Baltic Duchy
- Ober Ost

== Bibliography ==
- Robert G L Waite, Vanguard of Nazism, 1969, W W Norton and Company
