= Alfred Fletcher =

German politician and officer

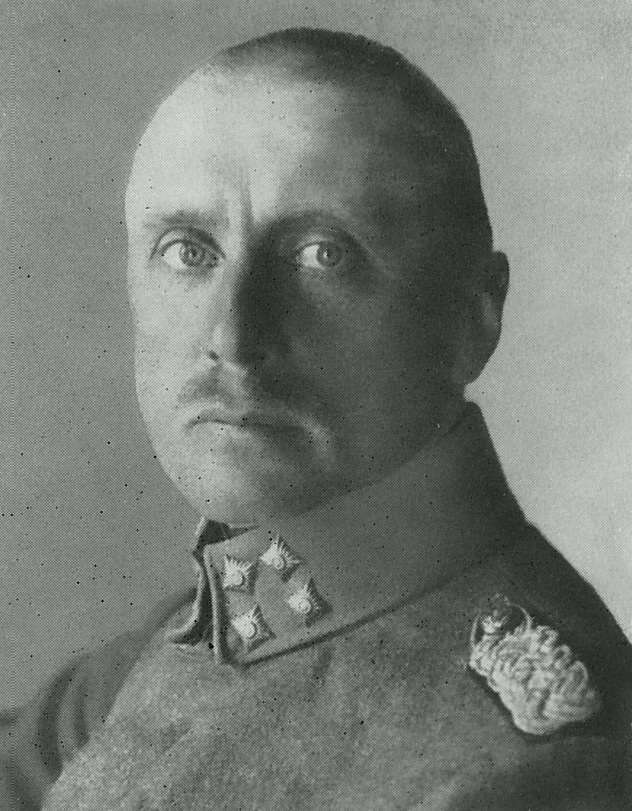
- Born: 20 January 1875; Province of Lower Silesia, German Empire
- Died: 20 September 1959 (aged 84) Herzogenaurach, West Germany
- Allegiance: German Empire; Baltische Landeswehr
- Conflicts: First World War; Latvian War of Independence

Alfred Fletcher (20 January 1875 Lampersdorf, Province of Lower Silesia, German Empire – 20 September 1959 Herzogenaurach, Bavaria, West Germany) was a German soldier, Major and politician.

== Life ==
Fletcher fought as a soldier in World War I. After the capitulation in November 1918 he became active in the Baltic states as commander of the pro-German Baltische Landeswehr. For a short while he was military governor of Riga where it experienced a period of White Terror against the local populace. After the defeat of his forces at Wenden in the Latvian war of independence, he returned to Germany and entered politics as a member of the German National People's Party.
