= Andrievs Niedra =

Latvian politician (1871–1942)

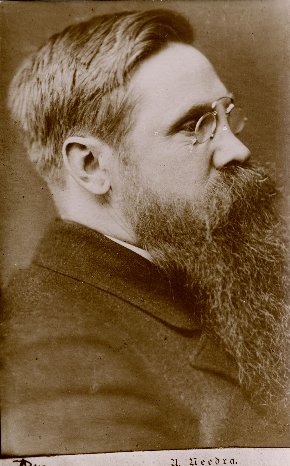
- Born: 8 February 1871; Tirza Parish, Governorate of Livonia, Russian Empire
- Died: 25 September 1942 (aged 71); Riga, Generalbezirk Lettland (now Riga, Latvia)
- Occupations: Writer lutheran pastor

Andrievs Niedra (Latvian old orthography: Andreews Needra; 8 February 1871 – 25 September 1942) was a Latvian writer, Lutheran pastor and the Prime Minister of the German puppet government in Latvia between April and June 1919, during the Latvian War of Independence.

Niedra's first collection of poems was published when he was only nineteen years old, and he was still in his teens when his stories based on history and folklore began to appear in the newspaper Baltijas Vēstnesis. Between 1890 and 1899 he studied theology at the University of Dorpat (now Tartu). Aesthetically blending realistic fantasy with idealism, his stories, criticism and plays often treated the formation of the Latvian intelligentsia and the situation of the peasantry with regard to the dominant Baltic Germans. Believing that society can only develop through evolution rather than revolution, Niedra was a fierce opponent of socialism and came to be seen as a reactionary in an increasingly revolutionary society.

After collaborating with the German military authorities and their defeat, Niedra fled Latvia. Returning in 1924, he was tried for treason and banished. In exile, the pastor of a German congregation in East Prussia, Niedra took German citizenship and penned a lengthy work entitled Tautas nodevēja atmiņas (The Memoirs of a Traitor to the Nation); the first edition of the first part was destroyed by the dictator Kārlis Ulmanis after the 15 May 1934 coup d'état, and his works were banned. Niedra returned to Latvia during the occupation of Latvia by Nazi Germany and died in Riga.
