= West Russian Volunteer Army =

Russian warlords in the Baltic during the Russian Civil War

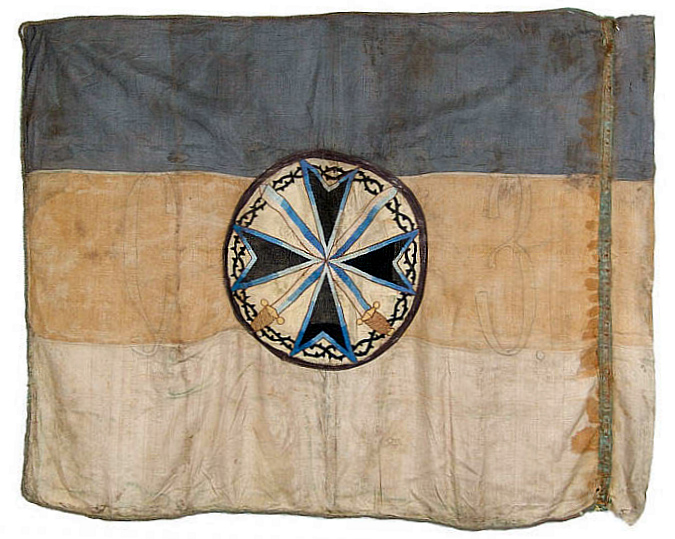
- The only surviving flag of the West Russian Volunteer Army
- Active: November 1918 – December 1919
- Allegiance: Russian State (officially); German Empire (unofficially)
- Size: 50,000 (Oct. 1919)
- Engagements: Russian Civil War: Estonian War of Independence; Latvian War of Independence; Lithuanian Wars of Independence

Commanders
- Notable commanders: Gen. Pavel Bermondt-Avalov; Gen. Rüdiger von der Goltz

Insignia
- Army Flag

The West Russian Volunteer Army (Note: Russian: Русская Западная добровольческая армия, romanized: Russkaya Zapadnaya dobrovol'cheskaya armiya) or Bermontians (Note: Latvian: Bermontieši; Lithuanian: Bermontininkai) was a pro-German White Russian military formation in Latvia and Lithuania during the Russian Civil War from November 1918 to December 1919.

== History ==
The WRVA, unlike the pro-Entente Volunteer Army in Southern Russia, was supported and in fact put together under German auspices. The Compiègne Armistice of November 1918, in article 12, stipulated that troops of the former German Empire would remain in the Baltic provinces of the former Russian Empire to help fight against Bolshevik advances and that such German units were to withdraw once the Allies determined that the situation was under control. The order to withdraw was given after signing of the Treaty of Versailles in June 1919. However, only a small portion of the Freikorps in the Baltic retired in response to the Allies' order; the rest remained under the leadership of the German Army General Rüdiger von der Goltz. To avoid casting blame on Germany and infuriating the Allies, von der Goltz withdrew into the background.

The first units of the future WRVA were brought from Germany to Latvia on 30 May 1919. On June 12, Pavel Bermondt-Avalov arrived in Jelgava with his headquarters, and on July 10 formed the Central Council of the Western Russian District. It put into circulation special money printed in Germany and followed the German government's instructions while receiving financial and military support from large German industrialists such as Krupp as well as others.

The WRVA first appeared in Lithuania, in Kuršėnai, on 26 July 1919, where they began to requisition apartments. Although the Lithuanian government demanded that the WRVA move out of Lithuania, they ignored the demands, meaning that only force would push it out. Initially, on the Lithuanian side, the units on the anti-Bermontian front were mostly the Raseiniai Commandant's Company on the right flank and the Pasvalys Battalion on the left flank, as well as Lithuanian insurgents.

In August 1919, von der Goltz merged his troops with the "Special Russian Corps", led by Cossack General Pavel Bermondt-Avalov. The two generals recruited about 50,000 men: mostly Freikorps members and Baltic Germans, as well as some Russian POWs captured by Germany in World War I and then released if they promised that they would help fight against the Bolsheviks in the Russian Civil War. The resultant Western Russian Volunteer Army declared that it would support the Russian White movement forces of Alexander Kolchak (then based in Siberia) and started marching eastwards (October 1919) with a stated intention of attacking the Bolsheviks, but its real goal appeared to be sustaining German power in the Baltic region.

== Confrontation with the governments of Latvia and Lithuania ==
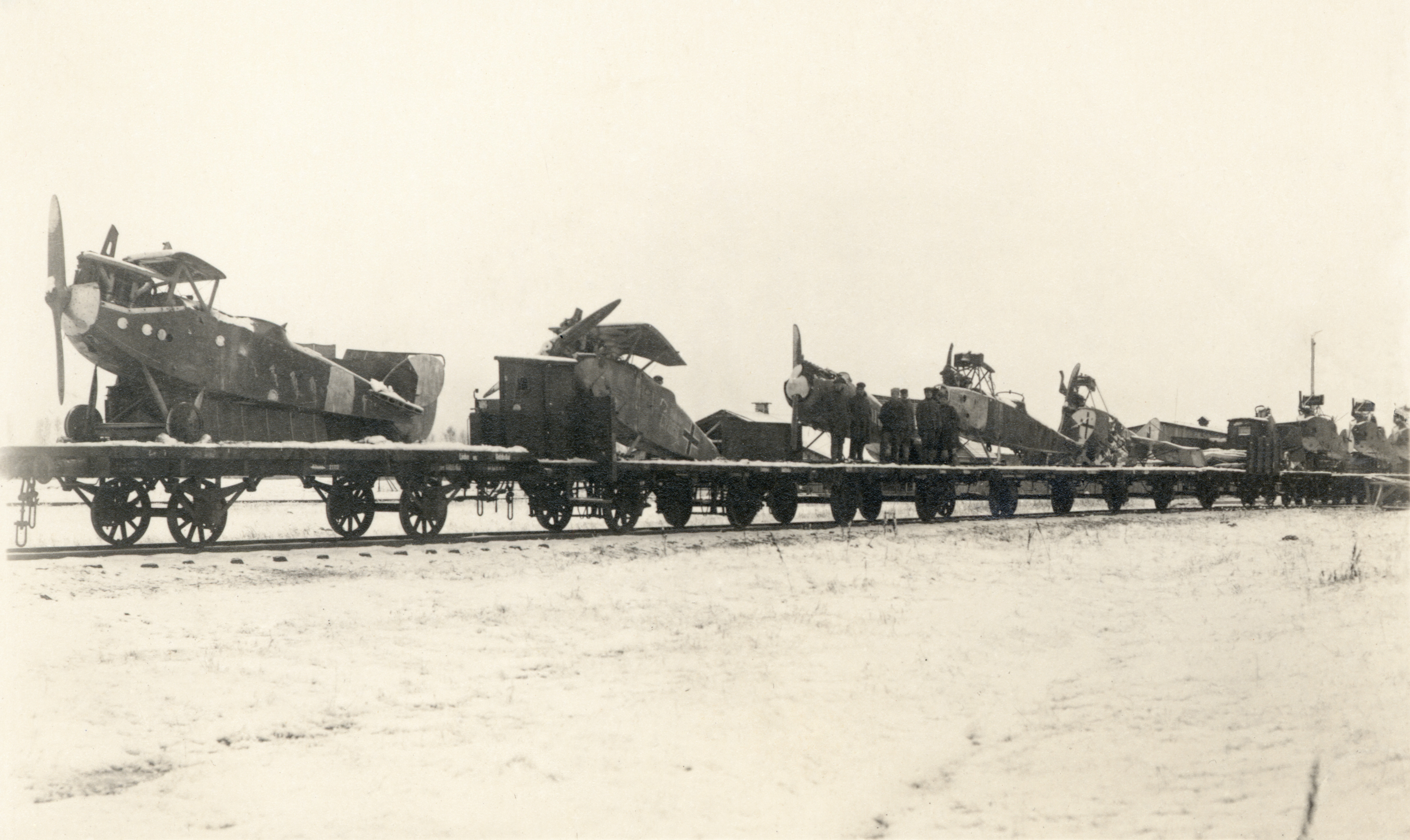
Bermontians' planes captured by the Lithuanian Army near Radviliškis

The political situation in the Baltic region continued to deteriorate. A new government in Lithuania refused to allow White Russians to pass troops through and establish a military base. After initially supporting the White Russians the Weimar government, under pressure from the Entente, banned the transfer of German soldiers to the Russians and ordered the Reichswehr to block the East Prussian border to block the Freikorps's supplies. General von der Goltz was finally recalled on October 4.

In this circumstances Bermondt-Avalov launched an offensive using the Freikorps in an attempt to force the Republic of Latvia to negotiate. With the support of British naval artillery and an Estonian armoured train, a Latvian counter-offensive followed in November, which forced Bermondt's army to withdraw. Mitau was also lost in loss-making fights.

In October 1919, the West Russian Volunteer Army attacked the newly independent states of Lithuania and Latvia, to which Germany had granted independence. It briefly occupied the west bank of the Daugava in Riga and the government of Kārlis Ulmanis had to request military assistance from Lithuania and Estonia. The Estonians sent two armoured trains to aid the Latvians while the Lithuanians were engaged in battles with the Bolsheviks and could only issue diplomatic protests. The Latvians also received assistance from the guns of a British Royal Navy destroyer, HMS Vanoc, in Riga harbour.

In October and November 1919, the WRVA occupied most of the Latvian territory on the Daugava's left bank, while also occupying the Lithuanian towns of Biržai, Radviliškis, Šiauliai, Raseiniai, Jurbarkas, Linkuva, and more towns, attacking the population and looting in the process. The threat posed by the Bermontians was such that the Lithuanian government had to withdraw part of the military units fighting against the Red Army to fight against them.

In November, the Latvian army managed to drive the Bermondt-Avalov forces into Lithuanian territory. On 11 November 1919, the WRVA were defeated by the Latvian army near Riga. Jelgava was also lost. On 18 November 1919, Germany announced that it was officially taking the WRVA under its protection. Finally, the WRVA suffered heavy defeats by the Lithuanian Army in the Battle of Radviliškis on November 21–22, but a further Lithuanian attack was stopped at the request of the Entente.

Upon defeat Bermondt-Avalov fled to Memel. The German Freikorps were handed over to the German Lieutenant General Walter von Eberhardt, successor to Goltz as commander of the VI Reserve Corps in Allenstein. With the involvement of the Entente military mission, General Eberhardt was able to organize evacuation of the remaining German Freikorps via Lithuania to East Prussia. The last WRVA units withdrew to Germany from Latvia and Lithuania on 1 and 15 December 1919, respectively.

== Army ==
The Army uniforms of the West Russian Volunteer Army were provided by Germany and decorated with Russian distinctive signs, in particular the shoulder legs according to the model of the Russian Imperial Army and an Orthodox cross worn on the left sleeve.

The army included:

- Corps Graf Keller (Colonel Potozki): from 7,000 to 10,000 soldiers, near Jelgava
- Corps Virgolitsch (Colonel Virgolitsch): from 3,500 to 5,000 mounted soldiers including Cossacks, stationed in northern Lithuania
- Iron Division (Major Bischoff): about 15,000 to 18,000, at Jelgava, joined in August
- German Legion (Captain Sievert): about 9,000 to 12,000 soldiers who had come together from various independent free corps.
- Freikorps Plehwe (Captain von Plehwe): about 3,000 soldiers (the former 2nd Guard Reserve Regiment), before Libau
- Freikorps Diebitsch: about 3,000 soldiers, for railway protection in Lithuania.
- Freikorps Roßbach: about 1,000 soldiers, appeared at the end of October after a march over 1,200 km off Riga.

== See also ==
- List of states and regions involved in the Russian Civil War
- Bibliography of the Russian Revolution and Civil War
- Outline of the Russian Revolution and Civil War
- White Movement
- Freikorps in the Baltic
- Baltische Landeswehr
- Estonian War of Independence
- Latvian War of Independence
- Lithuanian Wars of Independence
