= Protocol of St. Petersburg =

The Protocol of St. Petersburg may refer to:

- Protocol of St. Petersburg (1826), an Anglo–Russian treaty about the Greek War of Independence
- Protocol of St. Petersburg (1887), treaty of the Afghan Boundary Commission regarding Afghanistan's border with Russia
- Protocol of St. Petersburg (1904), an international anti-anarchist treaty
- Protocol of St. Petersburg (1913), a Bulgarian–Romanian treaty through which Bulgaria ceded Silistra to Romania
