= Nikolas Gvosdev =

Russian-American academic

Nikolas Kirrill Gvosdev is a Russian–American international relations scholar. He is currently professor of national security studies at the U.S. Naval War College and the former editor of the bi-monthly foreign policy journal, The National Interest. He writes as a specialist on US foreign policy as well as international politics as they affect Russia and its neighbors. He currently serves as editor of the journal Orbis.

== Biography ==
Gvosdev was born in New York to a family descended of White Emigres. Gvosdev received his D.Phil. as a Rhodes Scholar at St Antony's College, Oxford.

He worked as the executive editor and the founding editor of The National Interest. In 2005 he appointed the journal's now-defunct separate web edition, In The National Interest. Upon leaving the editorship in 2008, he was succeeded by Justine Rosenthal; he remains associated with the journal as a contributing editor. He has appeared as an analyst and a commentator on television and radio shows like CNN, Fox News, MSNBC, National Public Radio, BBC, C-SPAN's Washington Journal, CBC and Voice of America.

Gvosdev lived in Washington, D.C. and served as senior fellow for strategic studies at the Nixon Center, and as an adjunct professor at Georgetown University and George Washington University until 2007. In 2008 he moved to Newport, Rhode Island and started teaching at the Naval War College, where he is professor of national security affairs, holding the Captain Jerome E. Levy Chair in Economic Geography and National Security. He is married and has one son.

Gvosdev is a senior fellow with the Foreign Policy Research Institute, specifically as part of the Eurasia Program and the Program on National Security.

Along with Dimitri K. Simes, Anatol Lieven, and John Hulsman, Gvosdev is seen as one of the proponents of the "new realism" in foreign policy—one that acknowledges a greater role for values than traditional realpolitik as espoused by Henry Kissinger, but nonetheless puts a stress on setting priorities. He has also been one of the strongest proponents for engagement with Russia and has tended to view Vladimir Putin's government in a more positive light than most American commentators, characterizing his regime as "managed pluralism" rather than as an outright authoritarian state. Along with Ray Takeyh, he was an early skeptic of the proposition that the spread of democracy in the Middle East would bring pro-American governments to power.

Contributing to the anthology Our American Story (2019), Gvosdev addressed the possibility of a shared American narrative and focused on a sense of community, writing, "Shared participation in and celebration of the unfinished and ongoing American experiment is the best way to create and cement the bonds of fellowship and citizenship among Americans."

Since 2020, he has been cohost of the Doorstep podcast, an initiative of the Carnegie Council for Ethics in International Affairs. This is part of an effort to connect U.S. foreign policy with domestic concerns, as well as to explore new narratives for U.S. global engagement.

== Books ==
- Imperial policies and perspectives towards Georgia, 1760–1819 (St. Martin's Press in association with St. Antony's College, Oxford, 2000)
- Emperors and Elections: Reconciling the Orthodox Tradition with Modern Politics (Huntington, N.Y.: Troitsa Books, 2000)
- An examination of church-state relations in the Byzantine and Russian empires with an emphasis on ideology and models of interaction (Lewiston, N.Y.: E. Mellen Press, 2001)
- The Receding Shadow of the Prophet: The Rise and Fall of Political Islam (Praeger, 2004)
- Russian Foreign Policy: Interests, Vectors and Sectors (CQ Press, 2013, with Christopher Marsh)
- US Foreign Policy and Defense Strategy (Georgetown University Press, 2014, with Derek Reveron and Mackubin Owens);
- Communitarian Foreign Policy: Amitai Etzioni's Vision (Transaction Publishers, 2015)
- US foreign policy and defense strategy: the evolution of an incidental superpower (Georgetown University Press, 2015; with Derek S. Reveron and Mackubin Thomas Owens)
- The Oxford Handbook of U.S. National Security (Oxford University Press, 2018; with Derek S. Reveron; John A. Cloud)
- Decision-Making in American Foreign Policy: Translating Theory into Practice (Cambridge University Press, 2019; with Jessica D. Blankshain, and David A. Cooper)
