= Mežotne Palace =

Palace in Latvia

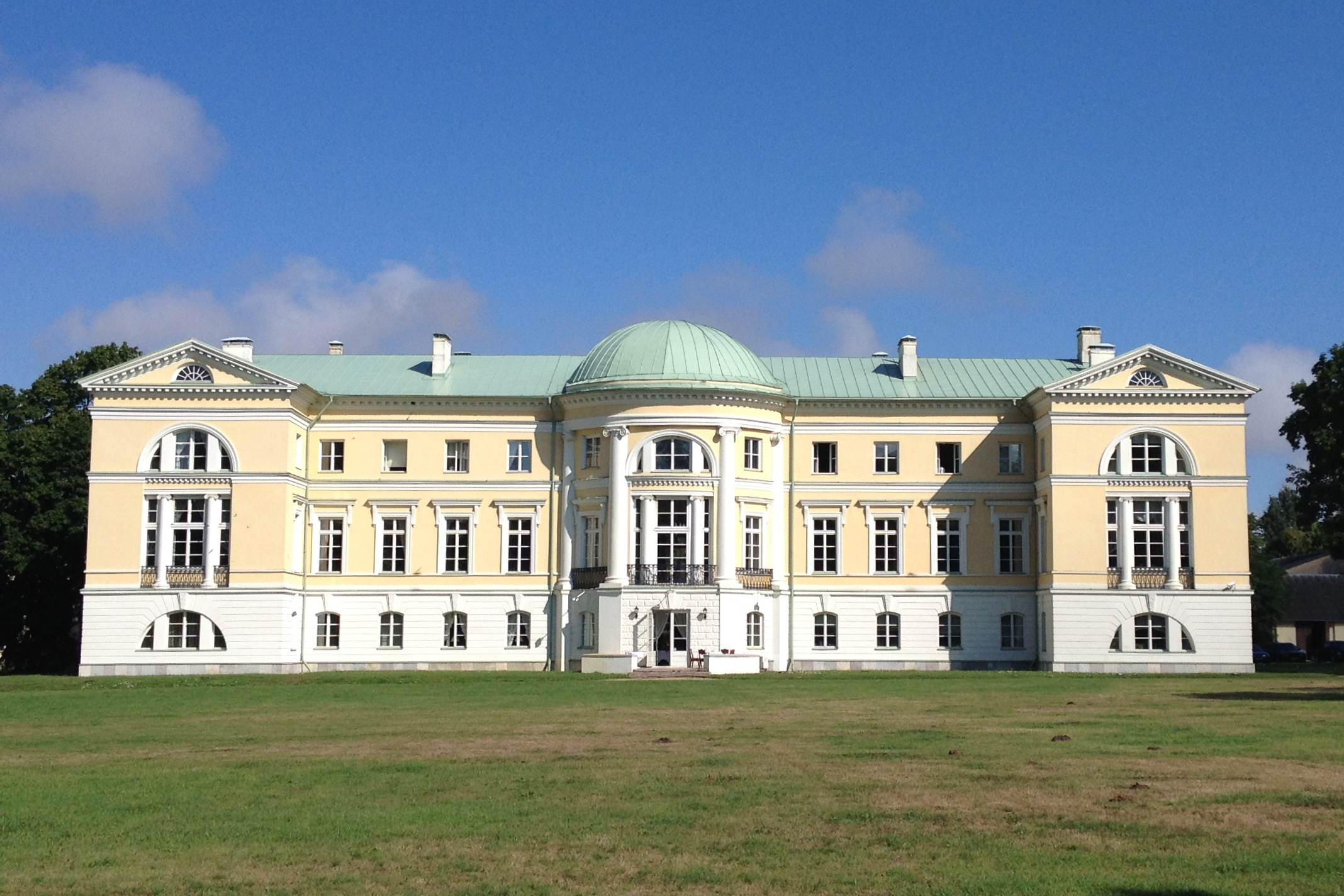
- Mežotne Palace seen from the park (2014)

- Location within Latvia

General information
- Architectural style: Classicism
- Location: Bauska municipality, Latvia
- Coordinates: 56.4383°N 24.0530°E
- Construction started: 1798
- Completed: 1802
- Client: Charlotte von Lieven

Design and construction
- Architects: Giacomo Quarenghi; Johann Georg Adam Berlitz

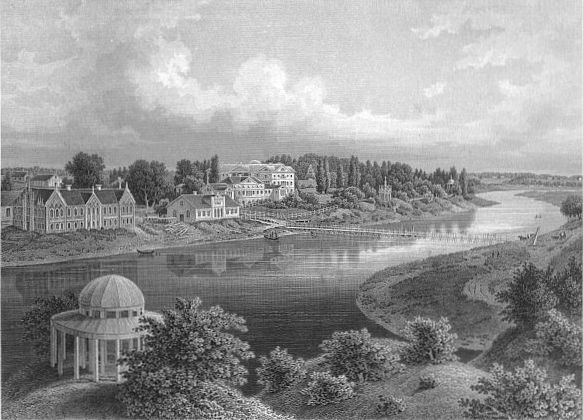
19th century view of Mežotne estate and Lielupe river

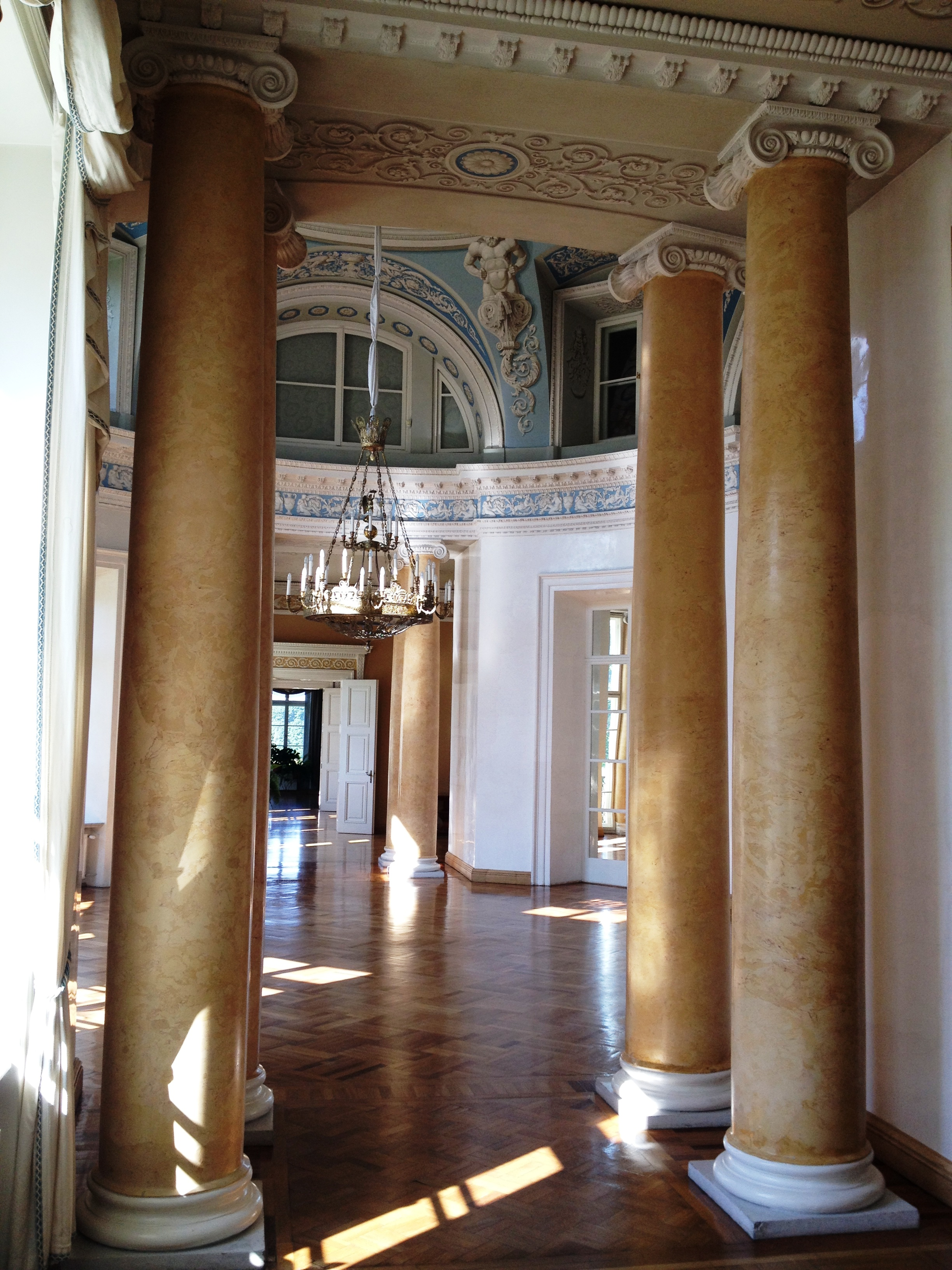
Domed main hall with columns

Mežotne Palace (Latvian: Mežotnes pils, German: Schloss Mesothen) is a manor house located in the Mežotne Parish of Bauska Municipality, in the Semigallia region of Latvia. The palace is one of the most outstanding examples of Neoclassical architecture in Latvia.

== History ==
In 1795, Empress Catherine II of Russia granted Charlotte von Lieven (1742–1828), the tutor of her grandchildren, a lifetime use of the property at Mežotne. In 1797, Emperor Paul I of Russia turned it into the hereditary estate of the Lieven family. In 1799, he raised her to the title of countess. In 1826 she was raised by Nicholas I of Russia to a princess. During the last years of the Duchy of Courland's history, the manor was rented by Johann Friedrich von Medem. His daughter Anna Charlotte Dorothea married Duke Peter of Courland.

The construction of the manor house was started in 1797 under the guidance of the architect Johann Georg Adam Berlitz. He used the neo-classical design by the Italian architect Giacomo Quarenghi and added side avant-corps to the building. The construction work was completed in 1802. An English style landscape park and complex of subsidiary buildings were added to the ensemble. A previous manor house already existed next to it and was renovated to become the caretaker's house and administrative centre. Other buildings include the dairy, stables, distillery, and others, which was able to make the estate largely self-sufficient.

Charlotte von Lieven lived permanently in St. Petersburg, together with the Czar's family. Only once did she have an opportunity to visit her estate at Mežotne. In 1818 she accompanied Empress Maria Feodorovna on her journey to Germany and on 2 September arrived in Mežotne. They spent one day there and left early in the morning.

After the death of Charlotte von Lieven in 1828, the manor was inherited by her son Johann who had returned to Mežotne in 1817 after his military service in the Russian army. His son Paul, the master of ceremonies at the Russian court and land marshal of the Vidzeme Knighthood, expanded his estate by obtaining the Bauska Manor with its castle ruins as well as Derpele and Krimulda Manors in Vidzeme.

In 1881 Mežotne was inherited by Paul Lieven's son Anatol. He started his career in St. Petersburg, but when he attained the rank of lieutenant of the Guards Cavalry, he left the army and settled in Mežotne.

The house suffered severe damage in 1919, when it was looted by the warlord Pavel Bermondt-Avalov's troops. In 1920, Prince Anatol Lieven was dispossessed of the estate as a result of the Latvian government's agrarian reform. It was used from 1921 until 1944 as the local agricultural school. During World War II, the manor was partially destroyed by artillery shells fired by the Soviet army in 1944. In 1946, the manor was taken over by the Latvian Agricultural Experiment Station. Restoration work started at the end of 1958. In 1996, the house was transferred to the control of the State Real Estate Agency, which carried out extensive reconstruction and restoration work in 2001, and a hotel opened.

The house and grounds are used today also for conferences and wedding receptions and other events.

== Architecture ==
The facade to the front has a portico with four columns, the part to the park has a semi-rotunda that both correspond to the design by Giacomo Quarenghi. The bel étage is located on the first floor, which can be accessed by a staircase that was built in the second half of the 19th century. The domed main hall stretches over two storeys, which was also designed by Giacomo Quarenghi. The main hall is in the centre of the house, on either sides are various salons and the dining room. The hall is built in the neoclassical style and the space was influenced by the Pantheon in Rome. The third floor was used as living quarters and guest rooms. The interior used to be filled with paintings, sculptures, porcelain and furniture.

== Garden ==
The park stretches behind the house and is styled in the English landscape garden. It goes down to the bank of the Lielupe River. Sheep are used to graze the grass and keep it trim.

== See also ==
- List of palaces and manor houses in Latvia

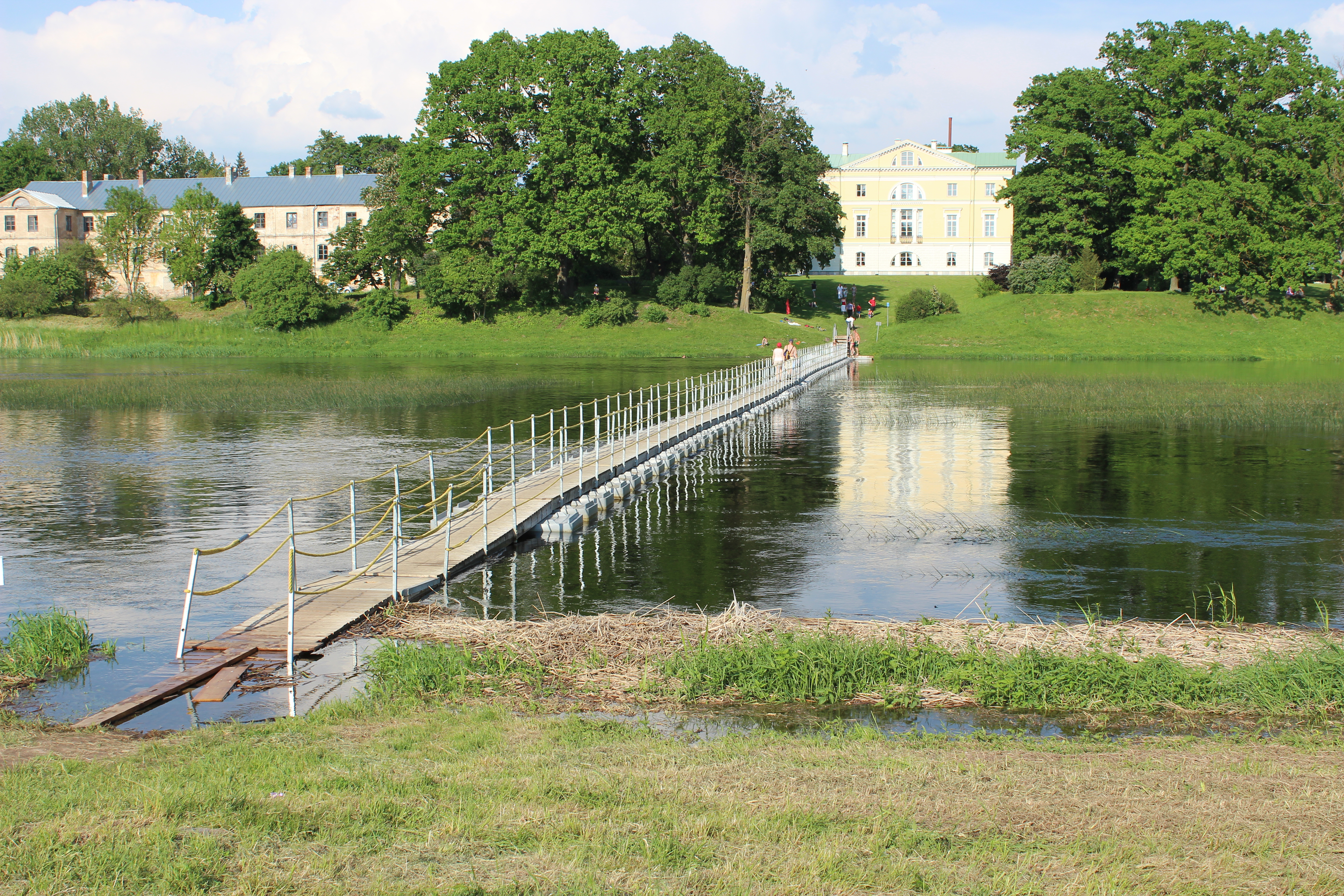
View towards palace and stables (on the left) from the bank of Lielupe River

== Sources ==
- Zarāns, Alberts (2006). Latvijas pilis un muižas. Castles and manors of Latvia (in Latvian and English). Riga. ISBN 9984-785-05-X. OCLC 72358861.
