= Secret Protocol =

Secret Protocol may refer to:

- Secret Protocol for the International War on Anarchism, a 1904 agreement that arranged the rendition of anarchists to their country of origin
- Secret protocol of the Molotov–Ribbentrop Pact, a 1939 agreement which partitioned Eastern Europe between Nazi Germany and the Soviet Union
- Secret Protocol, the 25th episode of the sixth season of Miraculous: Tales of Ladybug & Cat Noir.
