= Lieven =

Baltic German noble family

Lieven Līveni, Līvens, Liewen, Ливен
- Noble family
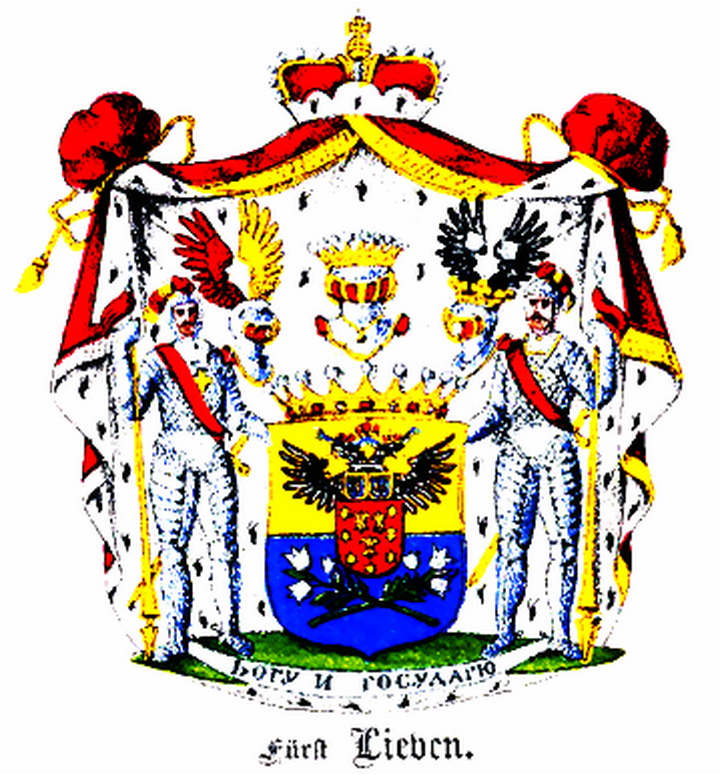
- Current region: Estonia, Latvia, Sweden, Russia, Ukraine, Germany, The Netherlands, France, United Kingdom
- Origin: Livonia
- Founded: Rome, 1203
- Founder: Caupo of Turaida
- Titles: Baron, Count, Knyaz (Prince)
- Traditions: Baltic Germans, Estonian Swedes, Rus'
- Motto: ´Si qua fors adiuvet’ 'For God and the Sovereign'
- Estates: Liivi Manor, Swedish Estonia

The House of Lieven (Latvian: Līveni; Russian: Ливен; Swedish: (von) Liewen) is one of the oldest and most aristocratic families of Baltic-German origin. As such, the family belonged to the Baltic German nobility (in the Duchy of Courland), and later to the Russian and Swedish nobility.

== History ==
The family is descended from Caupo of Turaida (Latvian, Kaupo), the Livonian quasi rex who converted to Christianity in 1186, when Bishop Meinhard attempted to Christianize the region. The Livonian Chronicle of Henry tells that in the winter 1203–1204 Caupo went to Rome with Theoderich von Treyden, a Cistercian monk who was later to become the founder of the Livonian Brothers of the Sword and the first bishop of Estonia. They were received in Rome by Pope Innocent III who supported their plans to Christianize Livonia, ennobled Caupo and granted him his coat of arms and the name Lieven. Caupo's grandson Nicholas was the first to spell his name Lieven.

According to feudal records, the Lieven ancestor Gerardus Līvo (1269) and his son Johannes (1296) entered service as vassals to the Archbishop of Rīga. One of Caupo's daughters married an ancestor of the barons, later Counts, of Ungern-Sternberg.

== Notable family members ==
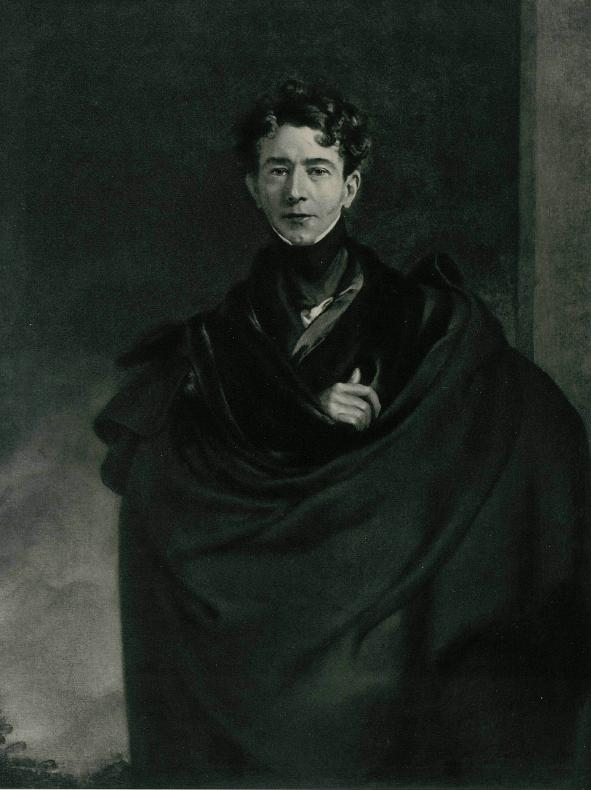
Christoph Lieven

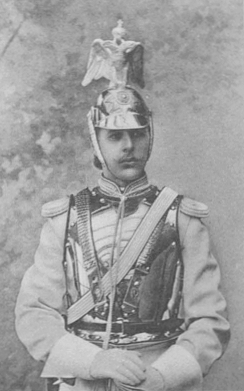
Anatol Lieven

- Reinhold Lieven of Eksjö, the Swedish governor of Ösel (Saaremaa), in 1653 was the first to be made a baron together with his brother, whose son Lieutenant-General Baron Hans Heinrich Lieven accompanied Charles XII in all his campaigns and expeditions. Before, he had studied philosophy at Leiden University in Holland, finishing his studies in 1637. Among Reinhold's descendants, one branch settled in Courland and was recognized in 1801 as in the Holy Roman Empire.
- Johann-Christoph Lieven was the first member of the family to gain distinction in the Russian service: he served as Governor of Arkhangelsk under Catherine the Great and as General of Infantry under Emperor Paul.
- Baron Otto Heinrich Lieven of Eksjö (1726–1781) married in 1766 Baroness Charlotte von Gaugreben (1743–1828), who was entrusted by Emperor Paul with the task of educating his daughters and younger sons, Nicholas and Mikhail Pavlovich. In recognition of her services Paul made her a countess in 1799. When her pupil Nicholas became the Emperor of Russia in 1826, the 84-year-old governess was made a Princess with the title of Her Serene Highness. The title was hereditary and passed to her descendants, of which the following were notable.
- Her son, Prince Christoph Heinrich von Lieven (1774–1838), accompanied Alexander I of Russia during the Battle of Austerlitz and at the signing of the Peace of Tilsit. In 1809 he was sent to represent Russia at the Prussian court and, in the crisis of the Napoleonic Wars in 1812, was transferred to London as the Minister Plenipotentiary to the court of St. James's, a post which he kept for 22 years. Somewhat overshadowed by his more illustrious wife, Dorothea von Lieven (née von Benckendorff), Prince Lieven took part in the Congress of Vienna and died in Rome when he accompanied the future Alexander II of Russia on his Grand Tour.
- His elder brother, Prince Carl Christoph von Lieven (1767–1844), started his career as an aide-de-camp to Prince Potemkin, administered the garrison of Arkhangelsk under Paul and ended his career as Imperial Minister of Education (1828–33).
- Prince Alexander Friedrich von Lieven (1801–1880), son of the preceding, Major-General, served as Governor of Taganrog in 1844–1853, and senator 1853–1880.
- Prince Nikolaus Wilhelm Karl Johannes von Lieven (1831- 1900), married to Mathilde Sophie von Manteuffel born 16.11.1847 in Saarenhof decided in Innsbruck 1930.
- Prince Andrey Alexandrovich Lieven (1839–1913), his son, was the Senator and Minister of State Properties in 1877–81.
- Jelena Lieven (1842–1917), Imperial Russian pedagogue, sister of the above.
- Prince Alexander Karl Nikolai von Lieven (1860-1914), was an admiral of the Imperial Russian Navy: in 1878 entered in service; in 1911 was appointed chief of the naval general staff.
- Prince Anatol Leonid von Lieven (1872–1937) commanded a Russo-German battle group in Latvia; Lieven forbade his men to fight the Estonian Army in Vidzeme, unlike the rest of the Baltische Landeswehr. His Liventsy performed only rear security services for the Landeswehr during the campaign. After the Latvian War of Independence he became a Latvian citizen and a manufacturer of bricks.
- Prince Maximilian Nikolai von Lieven (1887-1917), was a cavalry officer in the Imperial Russian Army. Married to Ekaterina Pavlovna Romanova. He served with the Chevalier Guard Regiment during the First World War and was killed on the Eastern Front shortly before the Russian Revolution.
- Elena Lieven (born 1947), a developmental psychologist at the Max Planck Institute for Evolutionary Anthropology in Leipzig and the University of Manchester.
- Dominic Lieven (born 1952), senior research fellow, Trinity College, Cambridge, and Fellow of the British Academy.
- Anatol Lieven (born 1960), visiting professor, King's College London, and senior fellow at the Quincy Institute for Responsible Statecraft.
- Dame Nathalie Lieven (born 1964), a Justice of the High Court of Justice of England and Wales

== In popular culture ==
Thomas Lieven is the name of the fictional protagonist of the tongue-in-cheek spy novel "It Can't Always Be Caviar" by Austrian writer Johannes Mario Simmel.
