= International Conference of Rome for the Social Defense Against Anarchists =

1898 convention against anarchists

The International Conference of Rome for the Social Defense Against Anarchists was held between 24 November and 21 December 1898 following the assassination of Empress Elisabeth of Austria by Luigi Lucheni on the promenade of Lake Geneva on 10 September 1898. Fifty-four delegates attended from 21 countries. Every participating government agreed to set up special organizations for the surveillance of those suspected of anarchism, defined as "any act that used violent means to destroy the organization of society."

The other resolutions drafted in the final protocol included the introduction of legislation in the participating governments to prohibit the illegitimate possession and use of explosives, membership in anarchist organizations, the distribution of anarchist propaganda, and the rendering of assistance to anarchists. It was also agreed that governments should try to limit press coverage of anarchist activities and that the death penalty should be mandatory punishment for all assassinations of heads of state.

The authorities used the opportunity to organize an international system of exchange among the national police agencies, using the portrait parlé method of criminal identification. This was developed from the bertillonage system invented by Alphonse Bertillon and involved the classification of criminal suspects on the basis of numerically expressed measurements of parts of their head and body.

A further anti-anarchist conference was held in Saint Petersburg in March 1904. This conference was called after an anarchist assassinated William McKinley, the President of the United States, on 14 September 1901. Ten governments sent representatives, including Germany, Austria-Hungary, and Denmark.

Here, the Secret Protocol for the International War on Anarchism was drawn up. Portugal and Spain were to subsequently agree to this, and while France and the United Kingdom decided not to sign the St. Petersburg Protocol, they did express a willingness to help other states on police matters relating to anarchism. The United States government neither participated in the St. Petersburg meeting nor agreed to follow its provisions. However, President Theodore Roosevelt, McKinley's successor, had called for an international treaty to combat anarchism.

The conference has been identified as the first international conference against terrorism.

== See also ==
- Assassination of Umberto I of Italy
- Assassination of Antonio Cánovas del Castillo
- Assassination of Sadi Carnot
- Attempted assassination of Alexander III
- Attempted assassination of Emperor Meiji
- Anarchism and violence
- Propaganda of the deed, the doctrine of the use of violence by anarchists around this time period
- Secret Protocol for the International War on Anarchism

== Bibliography ==
- Beugniet, Thomas (2016). Jeannesson, Stanislas (ed.). "La conférence anti-anarchiste de Rome (1898)" : et les débuts d'une coopération internationale contre le terrorisme de la fin du XIXe siècle à la Première Guerre mondiale, mémoire (in French). Nantes: University of Nantes.
- Deflem, Mathieu (2005a). "International Police Cooperation --History of". In Wright, Richard A.; Miller, J. Mitchell (eds.). The Encyclopedia of Criminology. Vol. 2. New York: Routledge. pp. 795–798. ISBN 1-57958-466-7. LCCN 2004004861.
- Deflem, Mathieu (2005b). ""Wild Beasts Without Nationality": The Uncertain Origins of Interpol, 1898-1910". In Reichel, Philip (ed.). The Handbook of Transnational Crime and Justice. Thousand Oaks, California: Sage Publications. pp. 275–285. ISBN 0761926224.
