= Dorothea Lieven =

European diplomatic figure (1785–1857)

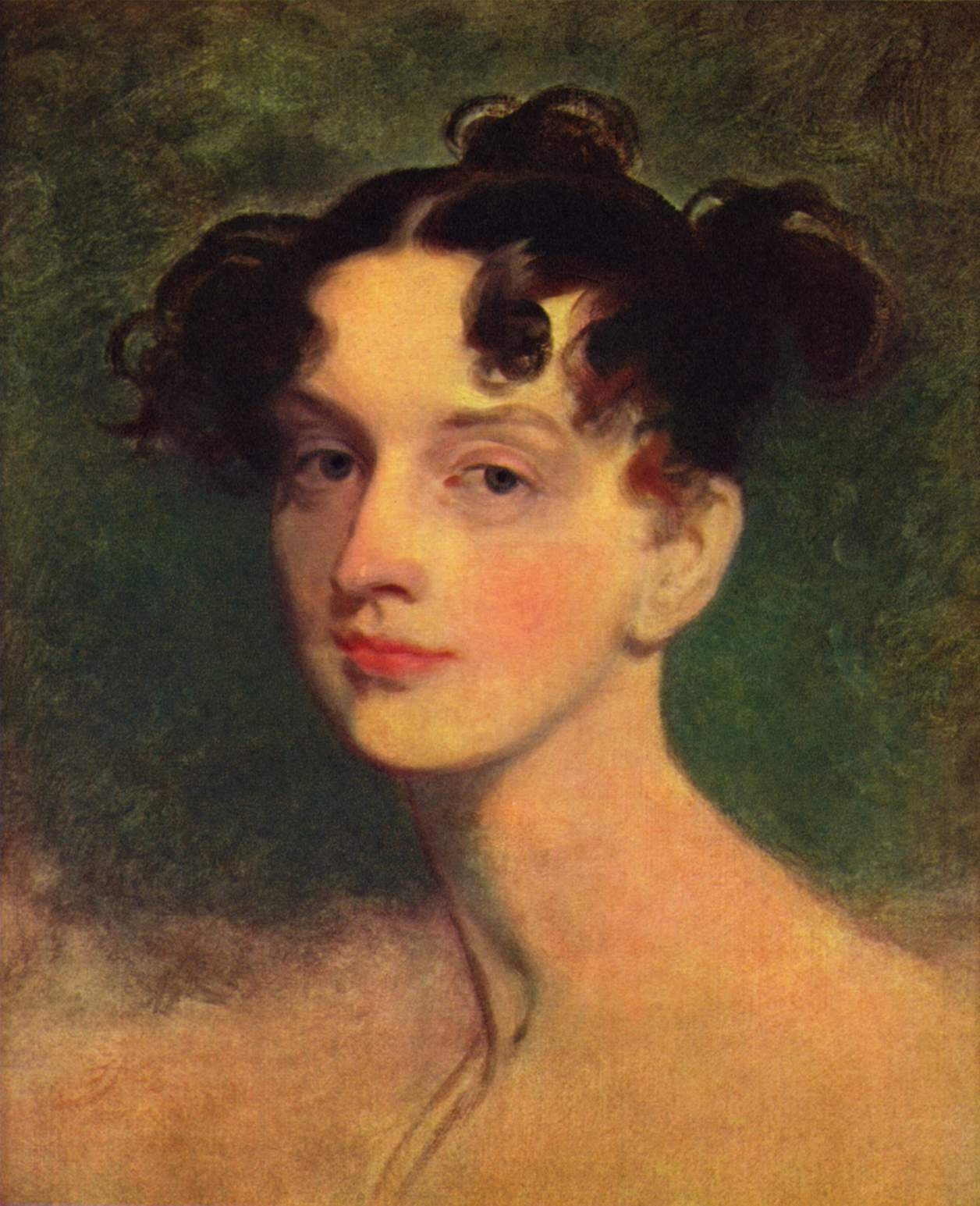
- Portrait by Thomas Lawrence, c. 1813
- Born: Katharina Alexandra Dorothea von Benckendorff; 17 December 1785; Riga, Russian Empire
- Died: 27 January 1857 (aged 71); Paris, France
- Title: Princess Lieven
- Spouse: Christoph von Lieven (m. 1800; died 1839)
- Children: 6
- Parents: Christoph von Benckendorff (father); Juliane Schilling von Canstatt (mother)
- Relatives: Alexander von Benckendorff (brother); Konstantin von Benckendorff (brother)

Princess Katharina Alexandra Dorothea von Lieven (Russian: Дарья Христофоровна Ливен, romanized: Darya Khristoforovna Liven; née Freiin von Benckendorff; 17 December 1785 – 27 January 1857) was a Baltic German noblewoman and the wife of Prince Christoph Heinrich von Lieven, who served as the Russian ambassador to London between 1812 and 1834. She became an influential figure among many of the diplomatic, political, and social circles of 19th-century Europe.

== Early life ==
Dorothea von Benckendorff was born into Baltic German nobility in Riga in what is now Latvia. She was the daughter of the General of the Imperial army Baron Christoph von Benckendorff (Friedrichsham, 12 January 1749 – 10 June 1823), who served as the military governor of Livonia, and his wife, Baroness Anna Juliane Charlotte Schilling von Canstatt (Thalheim, 31 July 1744 – 11 March 1797), who held a high position at the Romanov Court as senior lady-in-waiting and best friend of Empress Maria Feodorovna. Dorothea was the paternal granddaughter of Johann Michael von Benckendorff (1720–1775) and his wife, Sophie von Löwenstern (1724–1783), herself an Imperial governess.

Dorothea was the sister of the Russian generals Alexander and Konstantin von Benckendorff. Her sister Maria von Benckendorff (1784 in Saint Petersburg – 1841) married Ivan Georgievich Sevitsch.

Educated at Saint Petersburg's exclusive Smolny Convent Institute, Dorothea was assigned as a maid of honour to Maria Feodorovna. In St. Petersburg on 1 February 1800, at age fourteen, some months after finishing her studies, Dorothea married General Count (later Prince) Christoph von Lieven. Although the marriage was arranged, the couple managed to live in harmony for many years; only in the last years did serious differences arise between them that led to a total estrangement. They had one daughter and five sons, three of whom predeceased their mother: Magdalena (15 January 1804 – 1805), Paul (24 February 1805 – 13 October 1864), Alexander (9 March 1806 – 5 October 1885), Konstantin (24 April 1807 – 17 October 1838), Georg (27 October 1819 – 20 February 1835) and Arthur (1825 – 23 March 1838).

== Ambassador's wife ==
In 1810, her husband was appointed minister to Berlin. When Tsar Alexander I appointed Count von Lieven ambassador to Great Britain in 1812, Dorothea von Lieven used her intelligence, charisma, and social skills to make herself a leader of London's politicized society, thereby contributing materially to the success of her husband's embassy.

In London, Princess Lieven cultivated friendships with the foremost statesmen of her day. Moreover, she and Austrian Chancellor Metternich cultivated a notorious romantic liaison. She was also reputed to have had an affair with Lord Palmerston, although there is no firm proof of this. She was a close friend of Lord Castlereagh, and was one of the first people to voice concerns about his increasingly strange behaviour in the weeks leading up to his suicide. Lord Grey confided in her, even sharing with her his intense grief on the death of his grandson Charles in 1831; on the other hand, she admitted that the details of the Reform Act 1832 came as a complete surprise to her, which may be a sign that Grey did not entirely trust her in spite of their friendship.

In England's vibrant political environment, the princess discovered in herself a flair for politics. She also became a leader of society; invitations to her house were highly sought after, and she was the first foreigner to be elected a patroness of Almack's, London's most exclusive social club, where Lieven introduced the waltz to England. Despite her apparently frivolous nature, she had a deep religious faith, and seems to have disapproved of the death penalty far in advance of her time. She was described as something of a snob and made many enemies due to her alleged haughty manner towards those she regarded as social inferiors. Indeed, she wrote to her brother, "It is not fashionable where I am not".

Dorothea von Lieven's position as the wife of the Russian ambassador, her friendships, and her political acumen established her as a major political force. Though outwardly deferential to her husband, she was by far the stronger character and soon completely eclipsed him: London society jokingly called them "the two Russian ambassadors".

== Political career ==
In 1825, Tsar Alexander I entrusted Dorothea with a secret overture to the British government. "It is a pity Countess Lieven wears skirts", the tsar wrote to his foreign minister Count Karl von Nesselrode-Ehreshoven, "she would have made an excellent diplomat." In October 1825, when both were staying at the same resort in Brighton, Lieven in an "off-the-record" conversation with the British Foreign Secretary George Canning told him that Russia wanted bilateral Anglo-Russian mediation of the Greek War of Independence. She also spoke of the "barbarisation project" said to be planned for Greece by the Turkish government, which would have mandated the mass deportation of the Greek Christian population. Lieven passed on to Canning a note written in French as follows:

"The Court of Russia has positive information that before Ibrahim Pasha’s army was put into motion, an agreement was entered into by the Porte with the Pasha of Egypt that whatever part of Greece Ibrahim Pasha might conquer should be at his disposal; and that his plan of disposing of his conquest is (and was stated to the Porte to be and has been approved by the Porte) to remove whole Greek population, carrying them off to slavery in Egypt or elsewhere and to re-populate the country with Egyptians and others of the Mohammedan [Muslim] religion" .

Lieven's talks with Canning led to the Protocol of St Petersburg of 1826, in which Britain and Russia proposed to mediate, by force if necessary, the end of the Greek war.

The tsar's mission marked Dorothea Lieven's debut as a diplomat in her own right. She at least equalled her husband in importance. During Prince Lieven's ambassadorship in England (1812–1834), the princess played a role in the birth of modern Greece and made a notable contribution to the creation of the kingdom of Belgium. The appointment of Lord Palmerston as Foreign Secretary in 1830 is generally agreed to have been partly due to his friendship with Dorothea, who lobbied Lord Grey vigorously on his behalf. Her belief that Palmerston would be reliably pro-Russian turned out to be a mistake, however, since it was his quarrel with the tsar that ultimately led to her enforced departure from England. Her friendship with Palmerston was said to be due to a similarity in their mental processes: "an intelligence which depended not on education but experience and long observation of men and women". She was wise enough to use her influence discreetly: as she observed, a foreigner who meddles in English politics "is liable to end up with a broken neck".

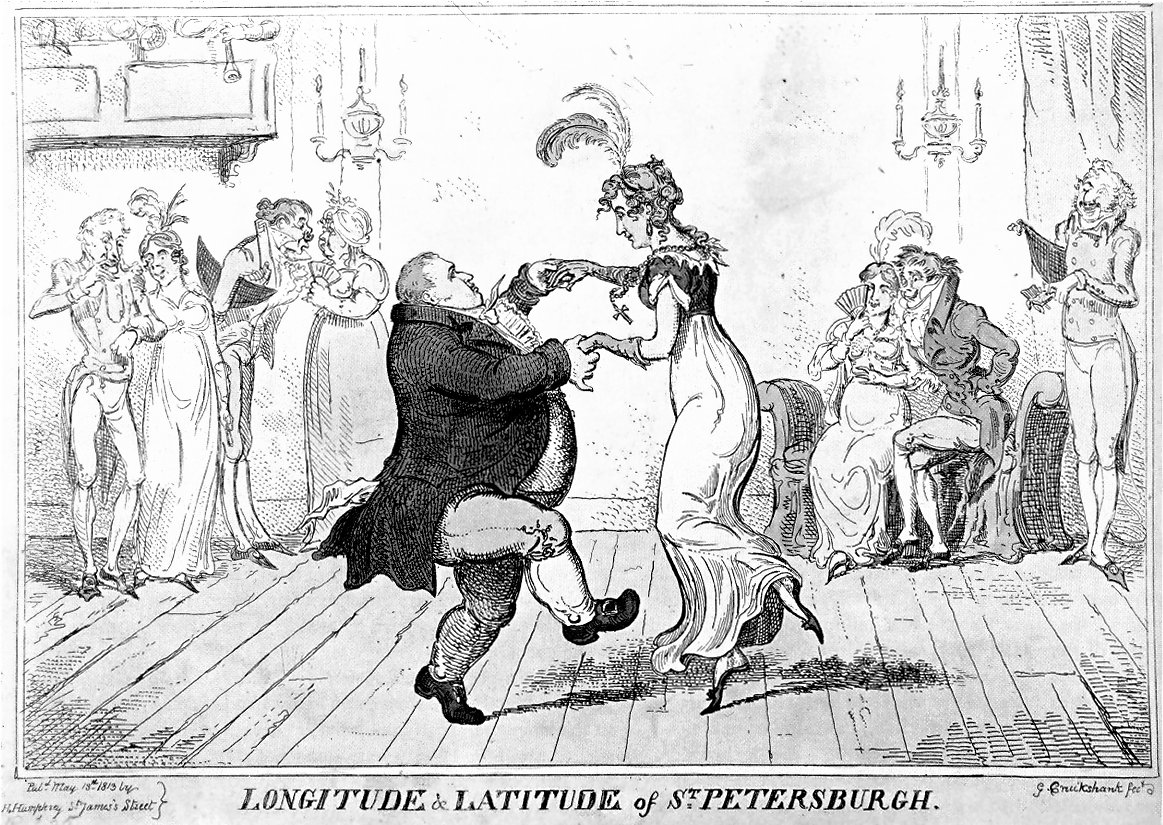
George Cruikshank's caricature of Princess Lieven waltzing with Prince Kozlovski at Almack's.

== Recall to Russia ==
In 1834, during a period of bad diplomatic relations between Russia and Great Britain, Tsar Nicholas I recalled Prince Lieven to become governor to the Tsarevitch. Despite her residence in London, the princess had already been appointed senior lady-in-waiting to Alexandra Feodorovna as of 1829.

After more than 20 years in England, the princess was horrified at the prospect of leaving her comfortable life and all her friends there; she had no wish to return to Russia, a country where she was no longer happy and whose harsh climate she now found difficult to endure. She never forgave her former friend Lord Palmerston, whose intransigence over what should have been a minor diplomatic row concerning the choice of the new British Ambassador to Russia, was largely responsible for the tsar's decision to recall her husband. Soon after the Lievens returned to Russia, their two youngest sons suddenly died. This tragedy and her declining health caused the princess to leave her native land and settle in Paris against the wishes of her husband and the tsar. She never saw her husband again, but she was genuinely grieved when he died in January 1839.

== Paris and Guizot ==
In a city where salons played an important social and political role, Princess Lieven hosted a salon that became known as "the listening/observation post of Europe". In 1837 she and François Guizot entered into a close personal partnership that lasted until the princess's death and included exchanging over 5000 letters. He was described by Hyde as "The greatest, and perhaps only true, love of her life."

During the Crimean War (1854–1856), Princess Lieven acted as an informal and trusted conduit between the belligerents. Much to her annoyance, all Russians were ordered to leave France at the outbreak of war, and she settled for a time in Brussels, which she detested. Eventually, she found life there so tedious that she returned to Paris without permission, and the Russian government sensibly let the matter lie.

== Death ==
Dorothea Lieven died peacefully at her home, 2 rue Saint-Florentin, Paris, aged 71, on 27 January 1857, with Guizot and Paul Lieven, one of her two surviving sons, beside her. She was buried, according to her wish, at the Lieven family estate of Mesothen (near Mitau) next to her two young sons who had died in St. Petersburg.

== Legacy ==
Historians have examined how Dorothea Lieven's political influence has been characterized. While early 20th-century accounts often portrayed female diplomats as mere 'gossips', later scholarship has re-evaluated her role, viewing her as a serious political actor whose diplomatic activity was a significant part of the political landscape.

Her influence was widely acknowledged by her contemporaries. The Russian foreign minister, Count Nesselrode, wrote that she "succeeded in inspiring a confidence... until now unknown in the annals of England." Through her friendships with figures like King George IV, Prince Metternich, Lord Palmerston, the Duke of Wellington, George Canning, Count Nesselrode, Lord Grey, and François Guizot, she directly and indirectly participated in major diplomatic events from 1812 to 1857. A French diplomat noted she "knew all the secret annals of diplomacy," though some, like Lord Palmerston, occasionally resented her interference.

Princess Lieven's extensive correspondence with these European luminaries has become crucial primary source material. Many of her letters and parts of her diary have been published, though a large collection of unpublished materials remains in the British Library and other European archives. The Austrian ambassador to France perhaps summarized her status best: "She is a stateswoman, and a great lady in all the vicissitudes of life."

Lord Palmerston, despite their friendship, seems to have resented her interference, writing that "a busy woman must do harm because she can do no good." She acquired a reputation as a Tsarist secret agent.

Princess Lieven's politically focused correspondence with luminaries across Europe has become primary source material for students of the period. Parts of the Princess's diary, her correspondence with Lords Aberdeen and Grey, with François Guizot, with Prince Metternich, and her letters from London to her brother Count Alexander von Benckendorff (head of the Russian secret police from 1826 to 1844) have been published. The British Library holds a vast trove of unpublished material, and several Continental archives have a scattering of unpublished correspondence.

== In fiction ==
She is a recurring minor figure in many historical novels about the period, notably those of Georgette Heyer. Heyer generally portrays her as a haughty, formidable and unapproachable leader of society, but in The Grand Sophy she is described as "clever and amusing", and there is a passing reference in that book to her role as a political intriguer.

== See also ==
- Christopher Lieven
- Dominic Lieven
- Elena Lieven
- Anatol Lieven
