= Christoph von Lieven =

Baltic German nobleman and Russian general (1774-1839)

Prince Christoph Heinrich von Lieven
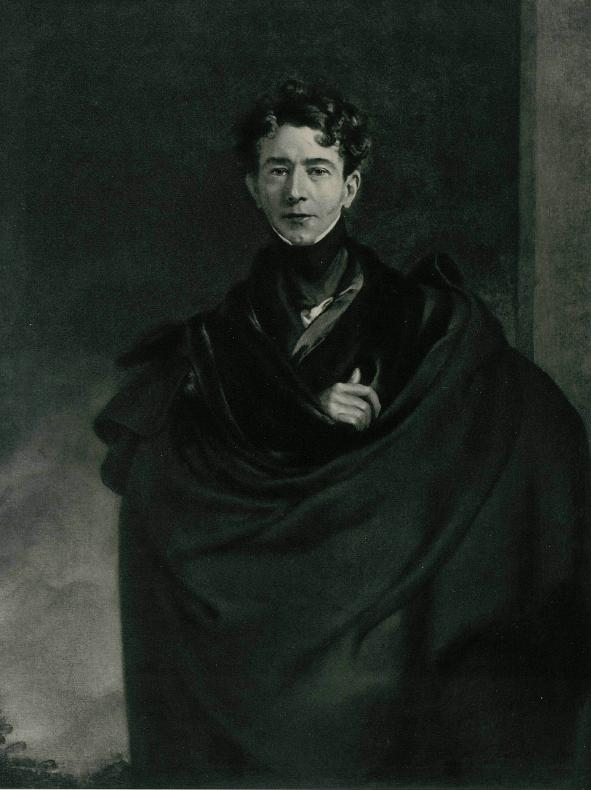
- Portrait by Sir Thomas Lawrence
- Born: 6 May 1774
- Died: 10 January 1839 (aged 64); Rome
- Spouse: Dorothea von Benckendorff (m. 1800)
- Children: 6
- Parents: Baron Otto Heinrich Andreas von Lieven (father); Baroness Charlotte von Gaugreben (mother)
- Military career
- Allegiance: Russia
- Branch: Imperial Russian Army
- Service years: 1789-1839
- Rank: Lieutenant general
- Conflicts: Persian Expedition; French invasion of Russia; Battle of Vishkovo; Battle of Austerlitz

Prince Christoph Heinrich von Lieven (Russian: Христофор Андреевич Ливен, Khristofor Andreyevich Liven; 6 May 1774 – 10 January 1839) was a Baltic German nobleman, Russian general, ambassador to London in 1812–1834, and educator of Tsesarevich Alexander Nikolaevich.

== Early life ==
Christoph von Lieven was born on May 6, 1774 (Old Style) into the old noble family of Lieven (Livonian-originated medieval Baltic German knights), as the third son of Baroness Charlotte von Gaugreben, afterwards 1st Princess Lieven (1743–1828) and Baron Otto Heinrich Andreas von Lieven of Eksjö (1726–1781) (source: Gustav Elgenstierna, Ättartavlor). Since his youth, his mother served as governess of the younger children of the then Grand Duke Paul Petrovich of Russia, Heir-Apparent to the throne of the then Empress Catherine II. As such, young Baron Christoph's "foster-siblings" were a number of young grand dukes and grand duchesses, including his future liege lord the Emperor Nicholas I (1796-1855).

== Career ==
=== Early military ===
Fifteen-year-old Lieven was registered in an artillery regiment, and made a quick military career: in 1791 he was promoted from the rank of warrant officer (Praporshchik) to the rank of second lieutenant (podporuchik) at the Semionovsky regiment; in 1794 to the rank of lieutenant (poruchik), and after a campaign in 1796 to the rank of lieutenant-colonel in the Vladimir dragoon regiment, later Tula musketeer regiment. Lieven was sent to Caucasus and participated in the Persian Expedition and in the Georgian expedition. In 1797, Emperor Paul I made him his aide-de-camp, and in 1798 he was promoted to the rank of Major-general and assigned to the post of the Director of the Mobile Field Chancellery (военно-походная канцелярия) of His Majesty. Lieven accompanied Alexander I of Russia during the Battle of Vishkovo and Battle of Austerlitz and at the signing of the Peace of Tilsit. He was promoted to the rank of lieutenant-general in 1807.

=== Ennobled to count and married ===
On 22 February 1799 Lieven received the title of Count, as his mother was granted a countship. He was somewhat overshadowed by his more illustrious wife, the famous socialite and political force, Dorothea Lieven, née Countess von Benckendorff (17 December 1785, Riga – 27 January 1857, Paris), whom he had married on February 1, 1800 in St. Petersburg. Together they had one daughter and five sons: Magda, Paul (24 February 1805 – 1866), Alexander (9 March 1806 – 5 October 1885), Konstantin (1807–1838), Georg and Arthur.

=== Diplomacy ===
In 1808 he was assigned to the Foreign Office. In December 1809 he was sent to represent Russia at the Prussian court and, when Napoleon prepared to invade Russia in 1812, was appointed Ambassador to the court of St. James, a post he kept for 22 years.

=== Ennobled to prince ===
In 1826, his mother was created 1st Princess of Lieven, whereby Count Christoph also received the title of Prince.

=== Governor ===
In 1834 tsar Nicholas I of Russia recalled Lieven to Russia and entrusted him to be governor of the heir to the throne, tsesarevich Alexander Nikolaevitch.

=== Death ===
Lieven died suddenly on January 10, 1839 at Rome as he escorted the future Alexander II of Russia on his Grand Tour.

== See also ==
- Dorothea Lieven
- Dominic Lieven
- Elena Lieven
- Anatol Lieven
