= Ray Takeyh =

American Middle East scholar

Personal details
- Born: 1966 (age 58–59) Tehran, Iran
- Education: University of Oxford (PhD)

Ray Takeyh is an Iranian-American Middle East scholar, former United States Department of State official, and a senior fellow at the Council on Foreign Relations.

== Early life ==
Ray Takeyh was born to an Assyrian family in Tehran, Iran in 1966. His family has origins in the village of Takeyh-Ardishai in Urmia. He obtained a doctorate in modern history from the University of Oxford.

== Career ==
Before joining the council, he was a fellow in international security studies at Yale University, a fellow at the Washington Institute for Near East Policy, a professor at the National War College, and a professor and director of studies at the Near East and South Asia Center at the National Defense University. He is married to Suzanne Maloney, Brookings Institution Deputy Director of Foreign Policy, also an Iran analyst.

Takeyh has written extensively on Iran and U.S. policy toward the Middle East. He has testified several times before various committees of the U.S. Senate. He has appeared as an Iran expert on a variety of television programs, including the PBS Newshour.

Takeyh assisted Dennis Ross in 2009 in the latter's position as senior Iran advisor at the U.S. State Department.

== Books ==
- Ray Takeyh, The Last Shah: America, Iran, and the Fall of the Pahlavi Dynasty (Yale University Press, 2021). ISBN 978-0-30-025626-0
- Ray Takeyh, Guardians of the Revolution: Iran and the World in the Age of the Ayatollahs (Oxford University Press, 2009). ISBN 978-0-19-532784-7
- Ray Takeyh, Hidden Iran: Paradox and Power in the Islamic Republic (Times Books/Henry Holt, 2006). ISBN 0-8050-7976-9
- Ray Takeyh, Nikolas Gvosdev, The Receding Shadow of the Prophet: The Rise and Fall of Radical Political Islam (Praeger Publishers, 2004). ISBN 0-275-97628-9
- Ray Takeyh, The Origins of the Eisenhower Doctrine: The United States, Britain, and Nasser's Egypt, 1953–1957 (Macmillan Press, 2000)
