= Treaty of London (1827) =

1827 treaty between the United Kingdom, France, and Russia

The Treaty of London (French: Traités de Londres, Russian: Лондонская конвенция) was signed in London on 6 July, 1827 by the United Kingdom of Great Britain and Ireland, Bourbon Restoration France and the Russian Empire. The three main European powers had called upon Greece and the Ottoman Empire to cease hostilities that had been going on since the Greeks revolted against the Ottoman rule on 17 March 1821. After years of negotiation, the European allied powers had finally decided to intervene in the war on the side of the Greeks. The Allied powers wanted the treaty mainly to cause the Ottoman Empire to create an independent Greek state. It stated that while the Ottoman Empire would recognise the independence of Greece, the Ottoman Sultan would be the supreme ruler of Greece. The treaty declared the intention of the three allies to mediate between the Greeks and the Ottomans. The base arrangement was that Greece would become an Ottoman dependency and pay tribute as such. Additional articles were added to detail the response if the Sultan refused the offer of mediation and continued hostilities in Greece. The articles detailed that the Turks had one month to accept the mediation or the Allied powers forming a partnership with the Greeks through commercial relations. Measures were also adopted that if the Sultan refused the armistice, the Allies would use the appropriate force to ensure the adoption of the armistice.

However, the Ottoman Empire, basing its decision upon its supposedly-superior naval force, declined to accept the treaty. The Treaty of London allowed the three European powers to intervene on behalf of the Greeks. At the naval Battle of Navarino, on 20 October 1827, the Allies crushed the combined Ottoman–Egyptian fleet in an overwhelming victory that forcefully and effectively created an independent Greek state.

The Treaty of London also bound Russia to a promise not to attempt any territorial aggrandisement at the expense of Turkey or secure any exclusive commercial advantage from Turkey as the result of any subsequent Russian war with Turkey. The war between Russia and Turkey, anticipated by the treaty, actually broke out in June 1828 when Russian troops crossed the Danube into the Ottoman controlled province of Dobruja. The war became the Russo-Turkish War of 1828–1829. The Treaty of Adrianople, signed by Russia and Turkey on 14 September 1829, ended the Russo-Turkish War. Besides recognising the independence of Greece, Turkey was forced by the treaty to give the Danube Delta and its islands and a considerable portion of the Black Sea south of the Kuban estuary to Russia. Because of the new territorial arrangements and the other articles contained in the treaty, Britain and the other European powers came to regard the Treaty of Adrianople as infringing on the promises that Russia had made in the Treaty of 1827.

== See also ==
- Greek War of Independence
- List of treaties
- Protocol of St. Petersburg (1826)
- Russo-Turkish War (1828–1829)
- Treaties of London
