= Protocol of St. Petersburg (1826) =

1826 Anglo-Russian agreement

The Protocol of St. Petersburg was an 1826 Anglo-Russian agreement for the settlement of the Greek War of Independence.

== Background ==
In 1821, the Greeks revolted against the Ottoman Empire. The majority of the European powers committed to uphold the status quo established by the Congress of Vienna supported the Ottomans. After the Congress of Vienna, the Great Powers of Europe consisting of Great Britain, France, Prussia, Austria and Russia were all united in the Quintuple Alliance and a policy of holding congresses to reach a consensus on all the issues facing European diplomacy, to maintain the Concert of Europe to prevent war and revolution in Europe. Of the European powers, the one most interested in the war was Russia, which under the Treaty of Küçük Kaynarca had a vague claim to be the protector of all the Orthodox peoples in the Ottoman Empire. Russian foreign policy was torn between the desire to help a fellow Orthodox people struggling against the Muslim Ottoman Empire, which was Russia's traditional archenemy vs. the desire to uphold the established order in Europe and the unwillingness to risk a breach within the "Concert of Europe" who were supporting the Ottomans. In July 1821, following the hanging of the Patriarch Gregory V of Constantinople on Easter Sunday 1821, Russia threatened war and broke off diplomatic relations with the Sublime Porte for this insult to the Orthodox faith. The Russian ultimatum threatened war “jointly with the whole of Christendom” if the Ottoman state continued to execute Orthodox clergy, which turned out to a bluff as the other Great Powers of Europe, namely Britain, France, Austria and Prussia all supported the Ottomans, arguing that the Sublime Porte had the right to crush the Greeks who rebelled against their legitimate government, and Russia backed down.

== Breakdown of the Congress system ==
Following further news of Ottoman atrocities against the Greeks, the Emperor Alexander I issued a mémoire for the other Great Powers, suggesting that the war be settled by breaking Greece into three semi-sovereign principalities whose princes were to be nominated by the Sultan as in the case of the Danubian principalities of Wallachia and Moldavia. Alexander’s plan was opposed by both the Austrian Foreign Minister Prince Klemens von Metternich and the British Foreign Secretary George Canning; one of the two sabotaged the Russian plan by leaking it to a Paris newspaper in May 1824, and moreover the Russian plan was rejected by the Greeks and the Ottomans. The Greeks insisted on full independence while the Ottomans were unwilling to cede any power to the Greeks.

One of the main issues for 19th century British foreign policy was the “Eastern Question”, namely how to maintain the declining Ottoman Empire and keep Russia out of the Balkans, which led the British to generally support the Sublime Porte against Russia. At the same time, widespread sympathy for the Greeks in Britain had led Canning to take certain pro-Greek steps, which as recognising Greek warships as legitimate belligerents instead of pirates in March 1823, much to the intense annoyance of Metternich, who was consistently the most pro-Ottoman statesman in Europe. In March 1824, Canning allowed a loan to be raised in the City of London for the Greek government. Canning stated in a speech he was opposed to intervening for the Greeks as to attack the Sublime Porte would be to “engage in unprovoked hostilities against that Power in a quarrel not her own”, but at the same time offered to mediate an end to the war, prepared that the Greeks and the Sublime Porte were willing to accept it. Canning stated he was only willing to offer mediation “conjointly with other Powers”, and Britain would not be bound by any decisions of the congresses of the Quintuple Alliance which united Britain, France, Prussia, Austria and Russia. Canning used a story from the Arabian Nights of a young man who to honor a miller stepped inside a mill wheel and agreed to turn it for a half an hour, “but being once in, is whipped on, every time that he attempts to pause; the miller, in the meantime, turning his thoughts to other business” . In Canning’s analogy, Britain was the young man and the Congress system in Europe the miller; if Britain agreed to abide by the congresses of the Quintuple Alliance, Britain would do the bidding of other European powers, which is why Canning preferred bilateral negotiations instead.

In January 1825, a congress of the Quintuple alliance met in St. Petersburg to discuss Alexander’s mémoire, which was not attended by Britain, and in which Austria, Prussia and France all came out in favor of the Ottoman position that the Greek war was an internal matter that did not concern them and allowing the Greeks any freedom would only encourage other European peoples to engage in revolution. Isolated and infuriated at Metternich’s pro-Ottoman policies, Alexander informed his ambassador in Vienna in August 1825 not to talk to Metternich as the Emperor was not receiving “that reciprocity of services which he had a right to expect” . Canning, who hoped to achieve an understanding with Alexander for a joint Anglo-Russian mediation of the Greek war of independence that would appease both British public opinion and keep Greece part of the Ottoman Empire, cultivated Princess Dorothea Lieven, the wife of the Russian ambassador to the court of St. James, Prince Christopher Lieven. The intelligent and able Princess Lieven was effectively the real Russian ambassador to Britain as she outshone her husband. The Princess de Lieven passed on a message to Canning from the Russian foreign minister Karl Nesselrode that Alexander no longer wanted to work through the congress system of the Quintuple alliance for a resolution of the Greek war, and was willing to engage in bilateral Anglo-Russian mediation of the war.

In October 1825, during a meeting with Canning in a spa in Brighton, Prince de Lieven told him in an “off-the-record” conversation that Russia wanted bilateral Anglo-Russian mediation of the war, and also spoke of the “barbarisation project” said to be planned for Greece. Unable to defeat the Greeks, the Sublime Porte had invited Muhammad Ali, the wali (governor) of Egypt to crush the Greeks who sent his son Ibrahm Pasha and an Egyptian army to Greece. Ibrahim Pasha was said to be planning the “barbarisation project” of deporting the entire Christian population of Greece to Egypt as slaves and to replace them with Egyptian peasants, thus solving the problems of the revolt in Greece and over-population in Egypt in one stroke. Prince de Lieven and British ambassador in Russia passed on to Canning a note written in French reading:

”The Court of Russia has positive information that before Ibrahim Pasha’s army was put into motion, an agreement was entered into by the Porte with the Pasha of Egypt that whatever part of Greece Ibrahim Pasha might conquer should be at his disposal; and that his plan of disposing of his conquest is (and was stated to the Porte to be and has been approved by the Porte) to remove whole Greek population, carrying them off to slavery in Egypt or elsewhere and to re-populate the country with Egyptians and others of the Mohammedan [Muslim] religion” .

The “barbarisation project”, if put into practice would make it inevitable that Russia would go to war with the Sublime Porte as such a blatant breach of the Treaty of Kutchuk-Kainardji could not be ignored by St. Petersburg, and Canning, fearing that Russia would defeat the Ottomans and knowing that British public opinion would be incensed by the “barbarisation project”, now stated for the first time that Britain was willing “to prevent, if necessary by force, the accomplishment of the plan imputed to Ibrahim Pasha”.

On 1 December 1825, Alexander died without legitimate children and was succeeded by his youngest brother Grand Duke Nicholas who become the Emperor Nicholas I. The man who was supposed to succeed to the Russian throne was the Grand Duke Constantine, the Russian governor of Poland who renounced his rights to the throne so he could continue to live with his Polish mistress in Warsaw without informing the Grand Duke Nicholas, who was surprised to be informed that he was now the Tsar. Nicholas was greatly shaken by the Decembrist revolt of December 1825, when a group of liberal-minded army officers tried to take advantage of the confusion over who was Emperor by launching a coup d’etat, which reinforced Nicholas’s hatred of all rebels against authority. Nicholas was very much an unknown quality in Britain, and Canning was deeply uncertain if Nicholas planned to follow Alexander’s foreign policy or not. Nicholas was an ultra-conservative, well known for his opposition to revolution and Lord Strangford, the British ambassador in St. Petersburg reported to London “the young Emperor Nick does not care a straw for the virtuous and suffering Greeks. He considers armed intervention or indeed any intervention at all as little better than an invitation to his own subjects to rebel” . To resolve the mystery of the new Emperor’s plans, the British cabinet decided to send the Duke of Wellington to St. Petersburg, ostensibly to congratulate Nicholas on succeeding to the throne, but in reality to see if he was willing to continue his brother’s plans for Anglo-Russian mediation of the Greek war of independence.

== The Protocol ==
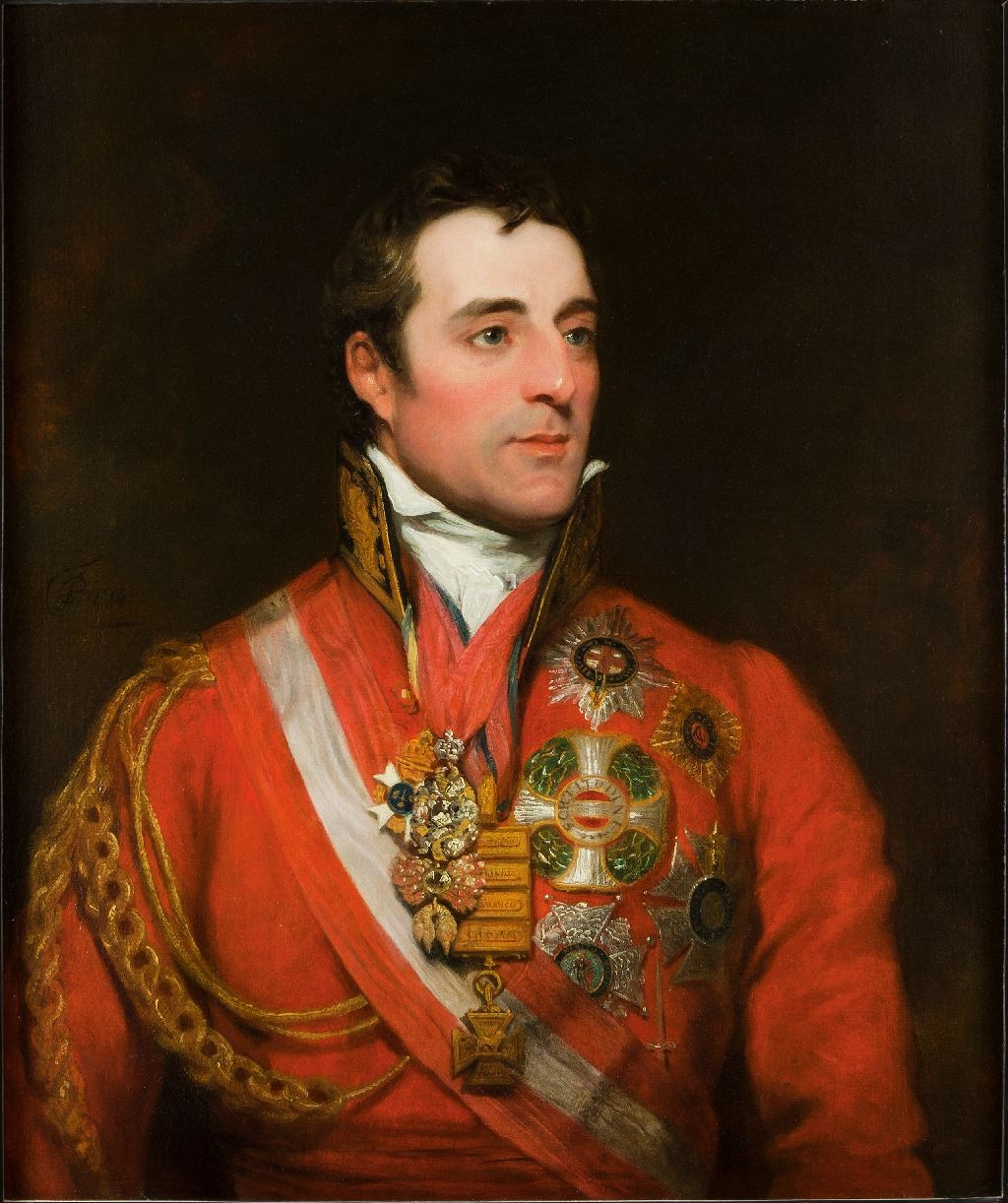
Portrait of the Duke of Wellington by Thomas Phillips

On 2 March 1826, Wellington met Nicholas to ask him what was his position on Greece. Initially, Nicholas was indifferent to the Greek question, but after Nicholas resolved a dispute over the Danubian principalities to Russian satisfaction by using an ultimatum threatening war if the Sublime Porte did not yield, and after Prince de Lieven arrived in St. Petersburg, serious talks began with Wellington. On 4 April 1826, the St. Petersburg Protocol, written in French, was signed by Prince de Lieven and Nesselrode for Russia and Wellington for Britain. The terms of the protocol were:

- Greece would become an autonomous part of the Ottoman Empire, whose government would pay an annual tribute to the Sublime Porte.
- The Greeks would choose their own government, but in selecting their leaders, the Sultan would play “une certaine part” .
- Greece would have complete freedom of conscience, trade and internal administration.
- To end the war, the Greeks would attain all property owned by Muslims in Greece (how this was to be done was not explained) .
- The borders of the new Greek autonomous region was to be settled later by talks involving British and Russian diplomats, plus the Greeks and the Turks.
- Both Russia and Britain would not seek territorial gains nor “exclusive” political and economic influence in Greece.
- Austria, Prussia and France were all invited to “guarantee” whatever settlement reached by Anglo-Russian mediation in Greece, which Britain would not “guarantee”.

== Impact ==
The importance of the St. Petersburg protocol rested less with its precise terms, but as the beginning of the internationalization of the Greek war of independence as for the first time, two of the Great Powers had agreed to a plan to impose mediation on the war, granting the Greeks a limited independence and were willing to use force if their offer of mediation was rejected. The protocol effectively destroyed the congress system where decisions reached by a congress of the powers of the Quintuple alliance was to decide the fate of Europe as Russia and Britain were prepared to act alone . Metternich completely rejected the St. Petersburg protocol, writing if the Irish revolted against the British crown and the King of France were to offer mediation: “Is England then ready to regard as a Power equal in rights to that of the [British] King the first Irish Club which declares itself the Insurgent Government of Ireland? To regard as justified the French Power which would accept the officer of mediator, by reason of the sole fact that the invitation had been addressed to it by the Irish government?...Whither does this absurdity not lead us?”. Prussia, which tended to follow Austria’s lead rejected the protocol while France hesitated. French foreign policy was torn between Paris’s traditional alliance with the Ottoman Empire vs. the pro-Greek feelings of the French people, and it was not until July 1827 that the French associated themselves with the Anglo-Russian offer of mediation. Muhammad Ali the Great was strongly pro-French, had recruited a French military mission of two French generals plus six other officers to train his army and purchased his weapons from France, and for all these reasons, the French government had been pro-Egyptian. However, French public opinion was solidly pro-Greek, and signs that Muhammed Ali was only using the French to achieve his own aims led Paris to a more pro-Greek position. On 10 August 1826, Canning passed along the terms of the St. Petersburg protocol to the French ambassador in London and in September–October 1826 paid an extended visit to Paris, meeting King Charles X at the Tuileries palace. Charles agreed to the protocol, largely because it was clear that Britain and Russia were going to act with or without France, and if the French took part in the offer of mediation, here was a way of asserting French influence in Greece whereas if the French did not, then Greece would fall entirely under Russian and British influence. After long talks, the British, French and Russian governments signed the Treaty of London in July 1827, which was largely based on the St. Petersburg protocol. The Treaty of London proposed an armistice and mediation of the war based on the protocol and warned that three powers would use force against whoever rejected their offer of mediation. The Greeks accepted the Anglo-Franco-Russian offer of mediation while the Ottomans rejected it. The stage was thus set for the Battle of Navarino, which saw the Ottoman and Egyptian navies destroyed by the British, French and Russian fleets and the Russo-Turkish War (1828–1829) which Ottomans lost.

== See also ==
- Greek War of Independence
- Russo-Turkish War (1828–1829)
- Treaty of London (1827)

== Sources ==
- Anderson, M.S. The Eastern Question, 1774-1923: A Study in International Relations (1966) online
- Brewer, David (2011). The Greek War of Independence: The Struggle for Freedom from Ottoman Oppression. London: Overlook Duckworth.
