= Anatol von Lieven =

Baltic German prince (1872–1937)

His Serene Highness Anatol Leonid Fürst von Lieven
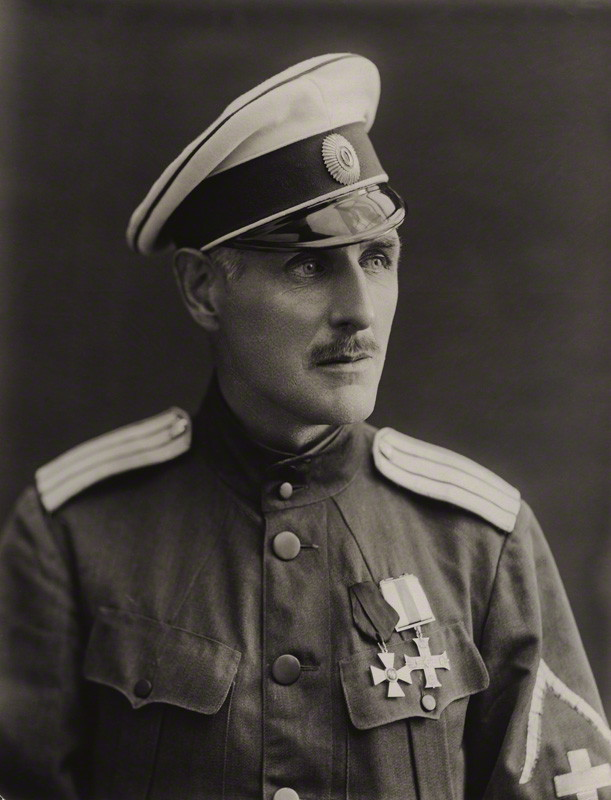
- Anatol Leonid Fürst von Lieven in an Northwestern Army officer uniform (1919)
- Born: 16 November 1872; St. Petersburg, Russian Empire
- Died: 3 April 1937 (aged 64); Ķemeri, Latvia
- Military career
- Allegiance: Russian Empire; Latvia
- Branch: Army
- Service years: 1896–1908; 1914–1919
- Rank: Colonel
- Conflicts: World War I Latvian War of Independence; Russian Civil War
- Awards: Order of St. George (IV class); Order of St. Anne (IV class); Order of St. Stanislaus (III class)

Anatol Leonid Fürst von Lieven (Russian: Анатолий Павлович Ливен; 1872 – 1937) was a Russian military commander from the Baltic German princely house of Lieven. During the Russian Civil War he commanded a White force in Latvia known after him as the Liventsy (Russian: Ливенцы; Latvian: Līvenieši).

== Biography ==
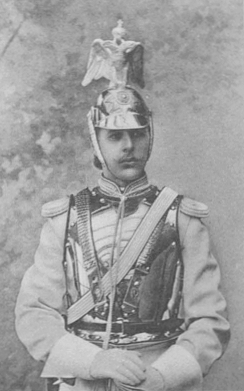
Anatol Leonid Fürst von Lieven in a cuirassier's uniform (1898)

Anatol von Lieven was born on November 16, 1872, in Saint Petersburg, the Russian Empire.

He graduated from the 3rd St. Petersburg Gymnasium in 1891 and from the Faculty of Law of Saint Petersburg Imperial University in 1895. After graduating from the university, on September 4, 1895, he entered the Chevalier Guard Regiment as a cadet. Having passed the officer's exam at the Nicholas Cavalry College, on September 7, 1896 he was promoted to cornet.

In 1898, he joined the Guards Cavalry Reserve and settled on his Mežotne Palace near Bauska. In 1900–1901 he was an indispensable member of the Courland Governorate's Peasant Affairs Council. In 1901, he was promoted to Kamer-junker.

In 1909, he was elected chairman of the Committee of the Council of the Russian Evangelical Union. In 1912–1914, he was the leader of the nobility of the Bauskas apriņķis.

=== World War I ===
With the outbreak of World War I, he returned to the Chevalier Guard Regiment. He was awarded the Order of St. George, 4th class. He was promoted to poruchik (lieutenant) on September 19, 1915, and to staff captain on September 19, 1916, and finally reached the rank of rotmistr (cavalry captain) by 1917.

=== Russian Revolution ===
On February 18, 1918, he was arrested along with his family. Lieven wrote in his memoirs:

"... a day before the start of the German offensive on Pskov and Narva ... the Bolsheviks arrested me with my wife and minor daughter."

Among 161 hostages, he was sent to Yekaterinburg and imprisoned. In March 1918, according to the Treaty of Brest-Litovsk, hostages from the Baltic states were transferred to the Germans in Orsha. After being released from captivity, he returned to his home in Latvia and took part in the Latvian War of Independence as part of the Baltische Landeswehr.

=== Latvian War of Independence ===
After the October Revolution, he returned to Latvia and in December 1918, arrived in Liepāja. In January 1919, he formed and led the Liepāja Volunteer Rifle Detachment (Russian: Либавский добровольческий стрелковый отряд, romanized: Libavskiy dobrovol'cheskiy strelkovyy otryad). The core of the newly-established unit were 60 former Russian Imperial army officers. Soon, this unit was complemented with one Baltische Landeswehr company and one company under the command of captain Dydorov. The unit became known as Līvenieši and it participated in the Latvian War of Independence fighting against the Bolsheviks.

During the pro-German coup in April 1919, Lieven refused to collaborate with the pro-German government. Later, his unit was incorporated into the Baltische Landeswehr and participated in battles around Ventspils, Jelgava and also the liberation of Riga. Together with parts of Rüdiger von der Goltz's Baltische Landeswehr at the end of May 1919, they forced the Bolsheviks out of Riga, which they had previously occupied. After Riga was taken, Colonel Lieven's detachment that pursued the retreating Bolsheviks was ambushed near Ropaži on May 24, 1919 and Lieven was seriously wounded in the thigh and stomach. The injury left him slightly lame for the rest of his life.

Although most of the Landeswehr, after the Latvians refused to recognize the pro-German regime of Andrievs Niedra, fought against independent Latvia, in May 1919, parts of the Landeswehr subordinate to Lieven recognized Latvia's independence and went over to the side of the Latvian armed forces. Lieven considered it fundamental, for the sake of the common anti-Bolshevik struggle, to support the independence of the Baltic states and abandon the idea of "one indivisible Russia". The same position was supported by Captain Dydorov, who replaced Lieven while his injury was treated. Thus, Lieven's supporters were respected in interwar Latvia and Estonia, where their association existed.

On June 6, 1919, Lieven's unit was transformed to the Russian volunteer corps with around 4,000 men. Lieven forbade his men to fight the Estonian Army and Northern Latvia brigade in Vidzeme, unlike the rest of the Baltische Landeswehr. His detachment only performed rear security duties for the Landeswehr during the campaign.

When the Strazdumuiža ceasefire was signed between the Baltische Landeswehr and Estonian army, Lieven transformed his corps into the West Russian Volunteer Army. Another two Russian units joined his army. Those were the partisan unit Cavalry General count Keller under command of Pavel Bermondt Avalov and infantry brigade under command of colonel Virgolitz. On 9 July, his army received an order from Nikolai Yudenich to move to Narva and join his Northwestern Army's offensive on Petrograd. Pavel Bermondt Avalov and colonel Virgolitz refused to leave Latvia and stayed in Jelgava. Bermondt took over command of the army and during October–November 1919, they were defeated by the Latvian army.

Lieven went to Estonia and until December 1919, fought with Yudenich's army around Petrograd. Lieven led the army's 5th Infantry Division, into which his detachment was reorganized. He also traveled to London and Paris and tried to negotiate further military support to Yudenich, however unsuccessfully.

=== Interwar ===
After the civil war, Lieven became a Latvian citizen and a manufacturer of bricks. Early in 1920, he returned to his Mežotne palace but soon traveled to France. He returned to Latvia in 1924; but meanwhile, Latvian agrarian reforms were launched and his Mežotne palace was seized by the government and his lands divided. However, he was granted a small manor nearby Mazmežotne, and he lived there and also in Riga for the rest of his life. Later, he established the Mazmežotne brick factory. He was also active in the anticommunist movement and led a local detachment of the Brotherhood of Russian Truth.

Anatoly von Lieven died on April 3, 1937, in Ķemeri, Latvia. He was buried in the yard of the Mežotne Lutheran Church.
