= Brotherhood of Russian Truth =

Russian emigrant organization

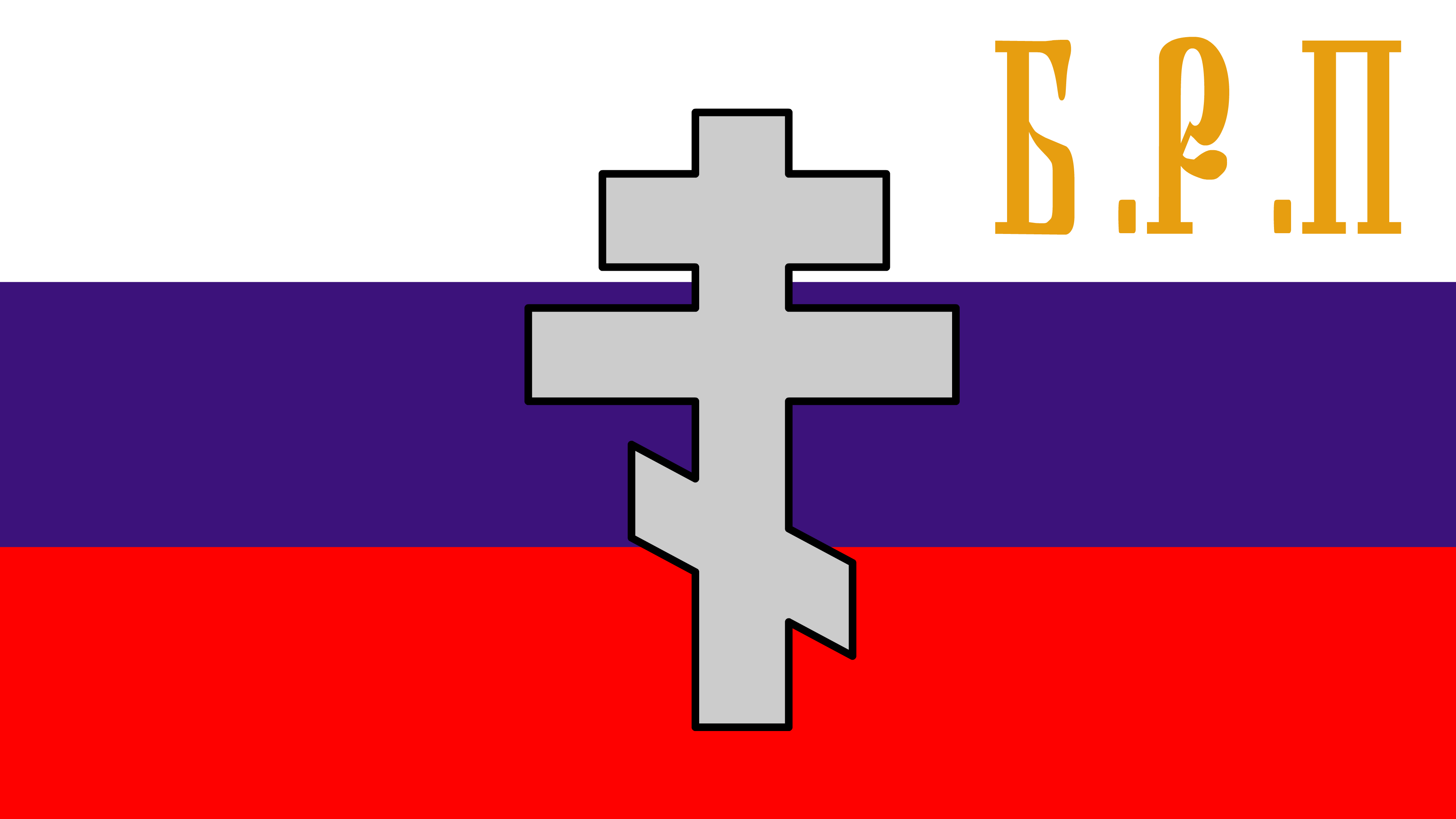
The flag of the BRP

The Brotherhood of Russian Truth (Russian: Братство Русской Правды) was a Russian counter-revolutionary nationalist organization established in 1921 by Pyotr Krasnov and other former members of the White movement, including Prince Anatol von Lieven, to overthrow Bolshevism in Soviet Russia. The term "Russian Truth" is the word used to describe the Russian code of laws established by the mediaeval Rus' Grand Prince, Yaroslav I the Wise. The political program of the Brotherhood was anti-communism with a monarchist, Orthodox Christian sentiment.

The main method of struggle for the Brotherhood was the establishment of an underground network of counter-revolutionaries within Soviet Russia. The Brotherhood sent agents to cross the Soviet border illegally, as did the Russian All-Military Union and the NTS. Unfortunately for the Brotherhood, agents working for the Inner Line disrupted their activities, causing considerable casualties.

The organization ceased its activity after its president Afinogen Argunov was killed in 1932 by a GPU agent.
