= Russian cruiser Diana =

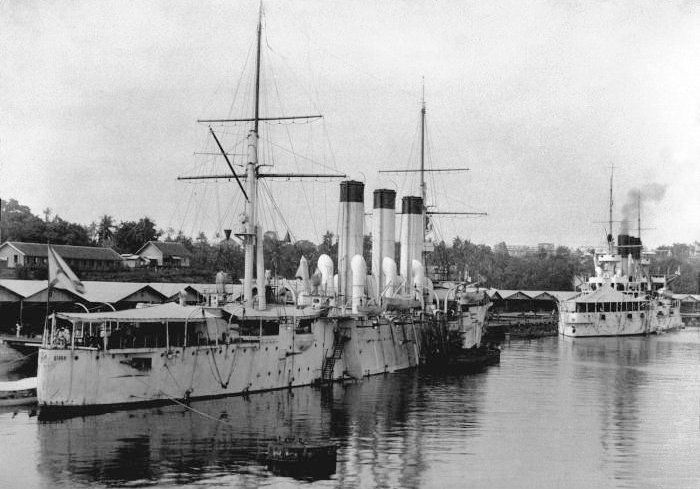
- Diana and Retvizan in transit at Weh Island, Dutch East Indies, on their way to Port Arthur in 1903

History

Russia
- Name: Diana
- Namesake: Diana
- Builder: Admiralty Shipyard, St. Petersburg, Russia
- Laid down: 23 May 1897
- Launched: 30 September 1899
- Commissioned: 10 December 1901
- Fate: Scrapped at Bremen in 1922

General characteristics
- Class & type: Pallada-class protected cruiser
- Displacement: 6657 tons
- Length: 126.8 m (416 ft)
- Beam: 16.8 m (55 ft)
- Draft: 6.6 m (22 ft)
- Propulsion: Triple shaft. Three triple expansion reciprocating steam engines; 24 coal-fired Belleville boilers. Total power 11,600 hp
- Speed: 20 knots (37 km/h; 23 mph)
- Range: 3,700 nautical miles (6,900 km; 4,300 mi)
- Complement: 19/540
- Armament: 8 × 152-mm/45 guns; 24 × 75-mm/50 guns; 6 × 37-mm/23 guns; 2 × 63.5-mm/19 guns; 3 × torpedoes; 35 naval mines
- Armor: Deck: 38 mm (1.5 in); Bevel: 50.8–63.5 mm (2.00–2.50 in); Conning tower: 152 mm (6.0 in)

Diana (Russian: Диана) was the second of three Pallada-class protected cruisers built for the Imperial Russian Navy. The cruiser served during the Russo-Japanese War and took part in the Battle of the Yellow Sea on 10 August 1904. Later, she served as part of the Russian Baltic Fleet during World War I.

== Operational history ==
Diana was the second of the three vessels in the Pallada class, built at the Admiralty Shipyard in St Petersburg, Russia. The class was intended to reinforce the Russian presence in the Far East. She was laid down on 4 June 1897, launched on 12 October 1899 and commissioned on 23 December 1901.

Soon after commissioning in late 1901, Pallada and Diana were assigned to the Russian Pacific Fleet based at Port Arthur. The ships departed Kronstadt on 17 October 1902, but the journey involved a number of difficulties due to inclement weather, mechanical failures and the consumption of more coal than originally anticipated. After numerous stops of refueling, the ships reached Nagasaki on 8 April 1903, where they rendezvoused with Askold, where she was placed at the disposal of Russian envoy A. Pavlov for his negotiations between the governments of Korea and Japan. She finally reached Port Arthur on 24 April.

=== Russo-Japanese War ===
Diana was damaged near her waterline during attack by the Imperial Japanese Navy on Port Arthur on the morning of 9 February 1904, by the cruiser squadron commanded by Admiral Dewa Shigeto, but was repaired in a few days. She fired eight 152 mm and 100 mm shots at Admiral Dewa's cruisers.

In the sortie led by Admiral Stepan Makarov on 13 April 1904, Diana was immediately behind the flagship Petropavlovsk when the battleship struck three naval mines and exploded and sank. Diana assisted in the recovery of survivors, and was not damaged in the incident.

On 22 April, in order to bolster the landward defenses of Port Arthur, two 152 mm guns, four 75 mm guns from the upper deck, and all eight 37 mm cannon and the two 63.5 mm rapid-fire cannons were landed from Diana and installed in fortifications facing the landward approach to the fortress.

On 23 June, under the overall command of Admiral Wilgelm Vitgeft, Diana was part of the aborted sortie which attempted to break through the Japanese blockade. The attempt was repeated on 10 August, resulting in the Battle of the Yellow Sea. The cruiser squadron was at the rear end of the line of battle and escaped major damage, although Diana was hit several times and had 10 crewmen killed and 11 wounded while covering the retreat of the bulk of the Russian fleet back to Port Arthur. Acting under the authority of Admiral Nikolai Reitsenstein, the Russian cruiser squadron attempted to break through the Japanese lines to join with Russian forces in Vladivostok. However, Captain Prince Alexander Lieven had previously disagreed with Admiral Reitsenstein over the choice of Vladivostok, citing its inadequate coal supplies, and decided to make a run towards the south instead. Accompanied by the destroyer Grosowoi, she managed to reach the German naval base at Kiaochou for refueling. Lieven ordered Grosowoi to Shanghai, where she was interned with the cruiser Askold. Diana continued on to Haiphong and from there to Saigon in French Indochina, where she arrived on 23 August and was interned by French authorities. In Saigon the ship's captain acted as a middle man for telegrams between Moscow and Zinovy Rozhestvensky leading his fleet towards the Battle of Tsushima.

After the end of the war, Diana returned to the Baltic Fleet, and was converted into an artillery training vessel. Her main armament was increased to ten 152-mm guns. She was overhauled again between 1912 and 1914, in which her boilers were replaced and her main armament was changed to two 130-mm guns.

=== World War I ===
With the start of World War I, Diana was assigned to the Second Division of cruisers in the Baltic Sea. She participated in the Battle of the Gulf of Riga in 1916 and 1917.

=== In Soviet service ===
On 3 March 1917, the crew of the Diana joined the February Revolution, killing a number of officers of the vessel. In October 1917, Diana participated in the Battle of Moon Sound.

In November 1917, she was assigned as a hospital ship and moved from Helsinki to Kronstadt in January 1918. From May 1918, Diana was permanently moored at Kronstadt and disarmed. Her guns were taken to Astrakhan and were mounted on vessels of the Caspian Flotilla.

On 1 July 1922, the hulk of Diana was decommissioned and towed to Germany. It was scrapped in Bremen in late 1922; however, she was not officially removed from the navy list until 21 November 1925.
