= Dominic Lieven =

English research professor

Dominic Lieven FBA
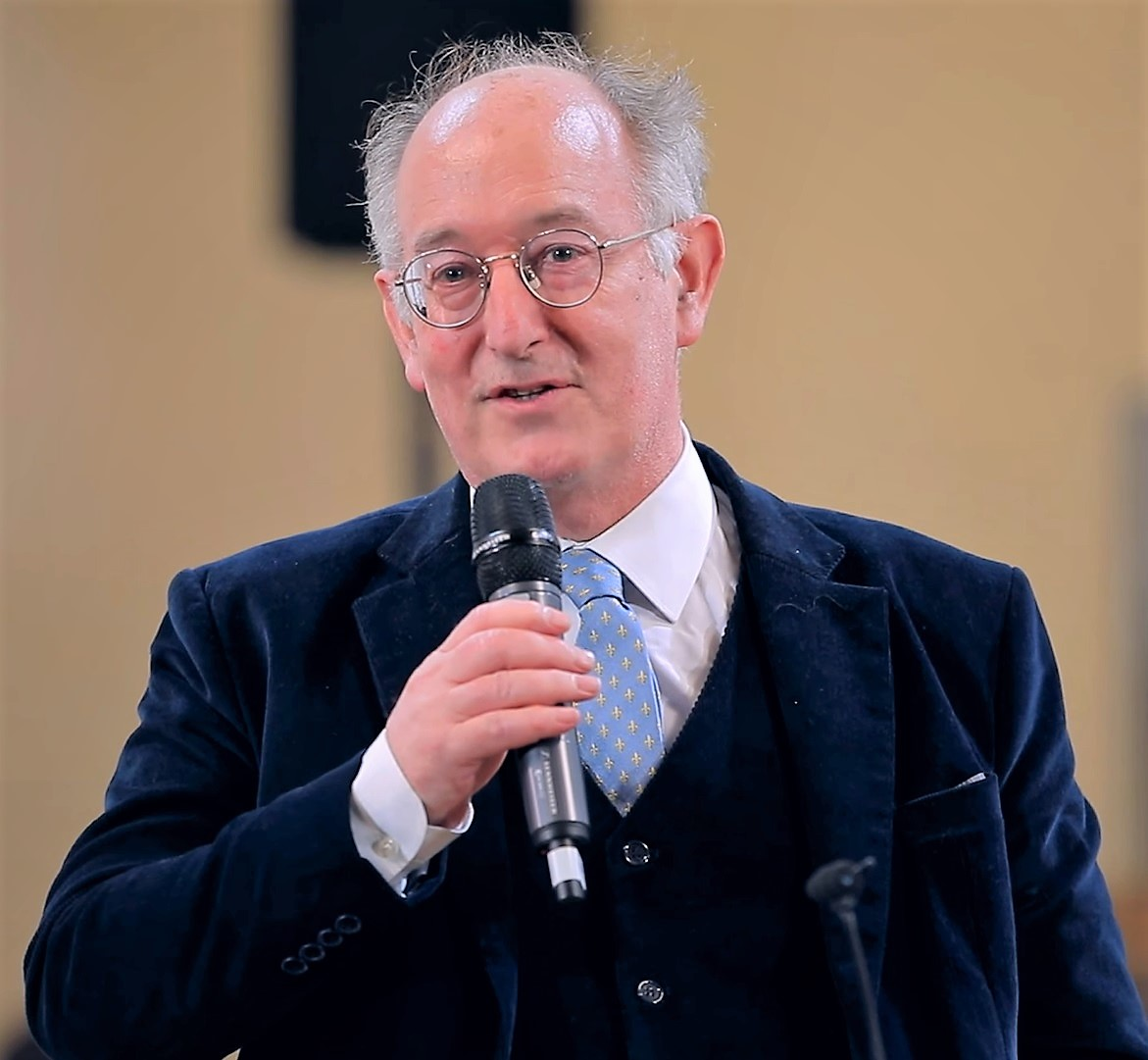
- Lieven speaks at Epiphany Nights in St. Petersburg in 2019
- Born: Colony of Singapore
- Citizenship: United Kingdom
- Title: Fellow of the British Academy
- Parent(s): Alexander Lieven and Veronica Monahan
- Relatives: Anatol Lieven, Nathalie Lieven, Elena Lieven, Michael Lieven
- Awards: Wolfson History Prize, Order of Friendship

Academic background
- Education: Downside School, Christ's College, Cambridge, Harvard University

Academic work
- Institutions: London School of Economics, University of Cambridge
- Doctoral students: Dejan Jović

Dominic Lieven (born 19 January 1952) is an English research professor at Cambridge University (Senior Research Fellow, Trinity College) and a Fellow of the British Academy and of Trinity College, Cambridge.

== Education ==
Lieven was educated at Downside School, a Benedictine Roman Catholic boarding independent school in Stratton-on-the-Fosse, near Shepton Mallet in Somerset, followed by Christ's College, Cambridge, where he graduated top of the class of 1973 (Double First with Distinction), and was a Kennedy Scholar at Harvard University in 1973/4.

== Professor of Russian and International history ==
Lieven is a writer on Russian history, on empires and emperors, on the Napoleonic era and the First World War, and on European aristocracy. Lieven is on the Editorial Board of Journal of Intelligence and Terrorism Studies. He was elected in 2001 Fellow of the British Academy, and was head of the History Department at the London School of Economics from 2009 to 2011; he was appointed lecturer there in 1978, and professor in 1993. He was appointed to his current position at the University of Cambridge in 2011.

== Political views ==
In May 2016, Lieven was one of 300 historians who were signatories to a letter to The Guardian warning voters that if they chose to leave the European Union in a process called Brexit on 23 June of that year, they would be condemning Britain to irrelevance.

== Controversy ==
Lieven was historical adviser on the BBC's television adaptation of War and Peace, which added incest to the narrative, and was slated by Downton Abbey adviser Alastair Bruce over its mistaken military costumes. Lieven said:

You couldn't completely rule out the strangest sexual antics in young aristocratic St Petersburg, though brother-sister incest is perhaps a bit ripe.... I thought it was pretty good given modern tolerances and pressures. It gets the spirit of Tolstoy and his book right.

== Personal life and ancestry ==
Dominic Lieven is the second son and third child (of five children) of Alexander Lieven (of the Baltic German princely family, tracing ancestry to Livonian chieftain Kaupo) by his first wife, Irishwoman Veronica Monahan (d. 1979). He is the elder brother of Anatol Lieven and Nathalie Lieven QC, and a brother of Elena Lieven and Michael Lieven and distantly related to Christopher Lieven (1774–1839), who was Ambassador to the Court of St James from Imperial Russia over the period 1812 to 1834, and whose wife was Dorothea von Benckendorff, later Princess Lieven (1785–1857), a notable society hostess in Saint Petersburg and influential figure among many of the diplomatic, political, and social circles of 19th-century Europe.

Lieven is "a great-grandson of the Lord Chamberlain of the Imperial Court" of Russia.

Lieven is a friend of Simon Sebag Montefiore, and has read at least one of the latter's manuscripts.

== Awards and honours ==
- 1973-4: Kennedy Scholar, Harvard
- 1985: Humboldt Fellow
- 1998-9: British Academy Research Fellow
- 2005-8: Leverhulme Major Research Fellow
- 2009: Prix de la Fondation Napoléon
- 2010: Wolfson History Prize, "Russia Against Napoleon" (Selected by The Economist as one of its "History Books of the Year")
- 2013: Order of Friendship, Russian Federation
- 2016: Pushkin House Prize, London, "Towards the Flame"

== Bibliography ==
- Russia and the Origins of the First World War, Macmillan Press (1983).
- Russia's Rulers Under the Old Regime, Yale University Press (1989).
- Aristocracy in Europe 1815/1914, Macmillan/Columbia University Press (1992).
- Nicholas II: Emperor of all the Russias, John Murray/St Martin's Press/Pimlico (1993).
- "Western scholarship on the rise and fall of the Soviet regime : the view from 1993". Journal of Contemporary History. 29 (2): 195–227. April 1994.
- Empire: The Russian Empire and its Rivals, John Murray/Yale University Press (2003).
- Russia Against Napoleon: The Battle for Europe, 1807 to 1814 Allen Lane/Penguin (2009).
- Towards the Flame: Empire, War and the End of Tsarist Russia Allen Lane/Penguin (May 2015).
- The End of Tsarist Russia: The March to World War I and Revolution, Penguin Random House (2015).
- In the Shadow of the Gods: The Emperor in World History, Viking (2022)
