= Nathalie Lieven =

English barrister

The Right Honourable Lady Justice Lieven

Justice of the High Court
- Incumbent
- Assumed office 11 January 2019
- Preceded by: Dame Anna Pauffley

Personal details
- Born: Nathalie Marie Daniella Lieven; 20 May 1964 (age 62)

Dame Nathalie Marie Daniella Lieven, DBE, (born 20 May 1964), known as Lady Justice Lieven, is a judge of the Court of Appeal for England and Wales.

Practising law since 1989, in her career as a barrister Lieven specialised in planning and administrative law and was appointed a Queen's Counsel in 2006.

== Early life ==
A member of the English branch of the Lieven family, originally Baltic Germans, on her father's side, and of Irish Catholic descent on her mother's side, Nathalie Lieven was born to Alexander Lieven and Veronica Eileen Mary (née Monahan) Lieven. She is the sister of Elena, Dominic, Anatol, and Michael Lieven.

She was educated at Trinity Hall, Cambridge, where she graduated BA in 1986, then trained as a barrister at Gray's Inn, London.

== Career ==
Lieven was called to the bar at Gray's Inn in 1989. She joined Landmark Chambers and later Blackstone Chambers. She specialised in planning and administrative law, appointed Queen's Counsel in 2006 and a deputy High Court judge in 2016.

Lieven was appointed as a High Court judge on 11 January 2019 and was assigned to the Family Division. She was appointed Dame Commander of the Order of the British Empire in December 2019.

Before her appointment as a judge, Lieven commented

"For me Magna Carta is an important part of the UK’s creation myth. Without knowing any of the detail of its provisions or its history, Magna Carta establishes the principle that Kings (or Prime Ministers) are subject to man-made law and to the judges who uphold it... It forms part of our belief in the core values of the UK and the values that the courts will always act to protect."

Lady Justice Lieven was appointed an Ordinary Judge of the Court of Appeal for England and Wales in October 2026.

Lieven was a Labour Party councillor for the Somers Town ward on the Camden London Borough Council from 1994 to 1998.

== Notable cases ==
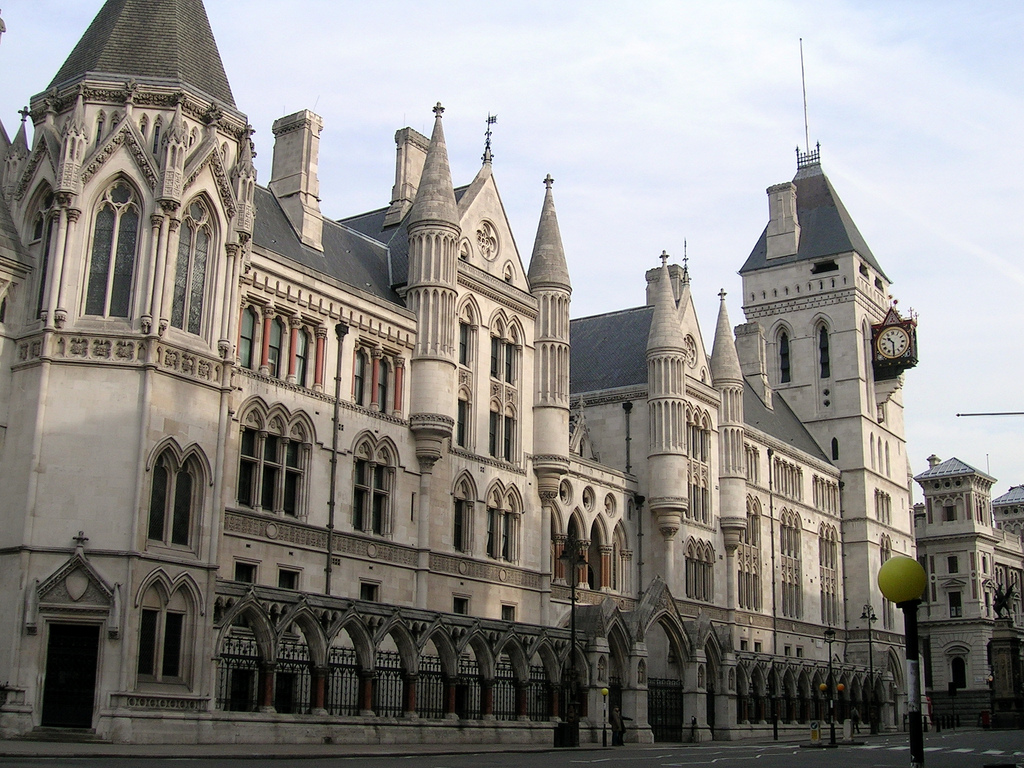
The Royal Courts of Justice

In June 2019, on the application of a National Health Service Trust in charge of an ante-natal clinic, Mrs Justice Lieven made an order in the Court of Protection for a pregnant Nigerian woman with learning difficulties to have a forced abortion against her wishes, on the grounds that it was in her best interests. She said she was not sure the woman understood what having a baby meant and that "she would like to have a baby in the same way she would like to have a nice doll". However, the woman's mother, represented by John McKendrick QC, appealed successfully against this decision to the Court of Appeal. The order was overturned by Lady Justice King, Lord Justice McCombe, and Lord Justice Jackson, with King explaining that "In the end, the evidence taken as a whole was simply not sufficient to justify the profound invasion of AB’s rights represented by the non-consensual termination of this advanced pregnancy."

In January 2020, in a legal battle between Manchester University NHS Foundation Trust and the parents of a child on a life support system, Mrs Justice Lieven gave permission for the life support to be withdrawn, having found that the child was "brainstem dead" and therefore had no best interests to consider.

In March 2021, Mrs Justice Lieven had to consider whether a transgender teenager with gender dysphoria who wished to continue with puberty-blocking drugs needed the permission of the court to do so. She found that "... the parents' right to consent to treatment on behalf of the child continues even when the child is Gillick competent to make the decision, save where the parents are seeking to override the decision of the child". As the parents and the teenager were in agreement, the treatment was to continue.

== Personal life ==
In 1995, Lieven married Stewart MacDonald Wright, a barrister. They have two children.
