= America Right or Wrong =

2012 book by Anatol Lieven

America Right or Wrong: An Anatomy of American Nationalism
- Author: Anatol Lieven
- Language: English
- Subject: Politics of the United States
- Published: Oxford, United Kingdom
- Publisher: Oxford University Press
- Publication date: 2012
- Publication place: United Kingdom
- Media type: Print
- Pages: 296
- ISBN: 9780199660254
- Dewey Decimal: 320.54097309051

America Right or Wrong: An Anatomy of American Nationalism is a 2012 book by the British author and academic Anatol Lieven. A separate, earlier version was published in 2004.

The book's argument draws on Lieven's journalistic experience in Eastern Europe, Afghanistan and Pakistan.

== Argument ==
In this book, Lieven explains the reasons behind the resurgence of nationalist tendencies in post-9/11 U.S. foreign policy, which he identifies in the combination between two opposing strands of American nationalism:

- the United States' civic nationalism, which embraces liberty and democracy as part of the American Creed and has been fueling a messianic vision of the nation's role in the world.
- a defensive nationalism which finds root in a paradoxical feeling of defeat, and Manichean notions seeing everything that goes against American policies as fundamentally Evil.

Lieven aims to warn Americans on how this combination of nationalisms has been fuelling a sense of self-righteousness and nationalist extremism, in ways that dangerously undermine the U.S.'s image and credibility on the global stage and complicated notably the success of the war on terror.

While maintaining a balanced discourse on the concept of American exceptionalism and the democratic aspirations of the American Creed, Lieven denounces Americans' tendency to hold as sacred national myths ideas like that of American original innocence. He argues that such sacred myths lead to a political rhetoric of correctness that has been preventing intellectuals—American or foreign—from calling these assumptions into question, dismissing any attempts at this as anti-American or worse. Lieven therefore warns against the refusal to face the failures of these ideas and the United States' ensuing foreign policy, highlighting how detrimental this state of denial is to the success of the war on terror and U.S. global leadership.

In the context of this discussion, the book refers to the far-right in American politics, the radicalisation of the Republican Party and the Tea Party movement.

== Reception ==
In Foreign Affairs the book was described as 'intelligent and often provocative' whilst in The Guardian the book was praised by Martin Woollacott who wrote 'We should have seen it coming. All the signs were there in the 1990s - the mania about resisting outside influences, the narrow religious beliefs, the harking back to a golden age, the sense of being under threat from modernity, the readiness to use violent means. The roots of it went back centuries. But it took the attacks of 9/11 for us to realise how powerful was this burgeoning extremism....We are not, of course, talking here about Islam or about al-Qaida and Osama bin Laden, but about America. It is Anatol Lieven's contention in this illuminating book that Bin Laden's assault on the United States stripped away many of the remaining restraints on the intolerant, irrational, and self-destructive side of American nationalism. Whether this nationalism is a greater problem than that represented by Islamic extremism is a moot point, but it is clear that the combination of the two could bring disaster on us all'. In the London Review of Books the work was praised as 'fascinating and incisive...a compelling argument'.
