= Alexander Karl Nikolai von Lieven =

Russian admiral (1860–1914)

Prince Alexander von Lieven
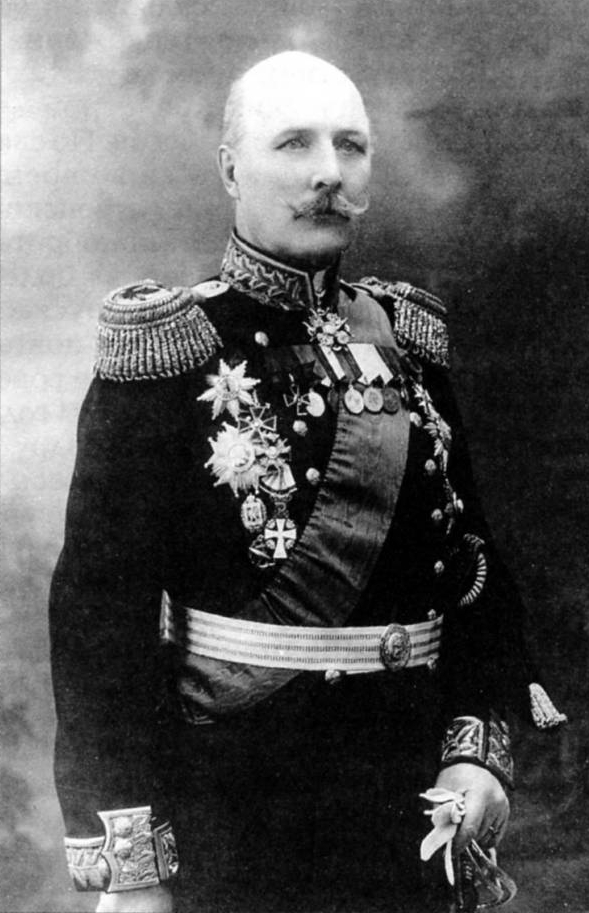
- Born: 7 July 1860; Zentene, Courland Governorate, Russian Empire
- Died: 23 February 1914 (aged 53); Udine, Italy
- Military career
- Allegiance: Russia
- Branch: Imperial Russian Navy
- Service years: 1870–1908
- Rank: Admiral
- Conflicts: Russo-Japanese War

Alexander Karl Nikolai, Prince of Lieven (Russian: Александр Александрович Ливен, romanized: Aleksandr Aleksandrovich Liven; 7 July 1860 – 23 February 1914) was a vice admiral in the Imperial Russian Navy.

== Biography ==
Lieven was born in 1860. He was the son of Alexander Otto Karl Theodor von Lieven, from one of the oldest families of Baltic Germans. He graduated from the Berlin Cadet Corps and served initially in the Semenov Regiment of the Imperial Guards. However, in 1884 he transferred to the Imperial Russian Navy and graduated from the Sea Cadets in 1884. He commanded a number of destroyers in the Baltic Fleet, and was awarded the Order of St Anna, 3rd class in 1896. In 1898 he graduated from the naval academy and was promoted to captain, 2nd class. Lieven was assigned to the battleship Poltava from 1898 to 1901.

In 1900, Lieven was sent as a military attaché to the United States, and acted as a military observer during the Spanish–American War. He was awarded the Order of Saint Stanislaus, 2nd degree the same year, followed by the Order of St Anna, 2nd degree and the Order of St Vladimir, 4th degree with bow, in 1903.

During the Russo-Japanese War, Lieven was initially in command of the mine defenses of Port Arthur, followed by the gunboat Bobr. He was subsequent appointed captain of the cruiser Diana. During the Battle of the Yellow Sea, he was one of the few captains to break the Japanese blockade, and was interned in Saigon, French Indochina until the end of the war. For this feat, he was awarded the Gold Sword for Bravery and was promoted to captain, 1st rank.

After the end of the war, Lieven became captain of the cruiser Pamiat Azova in 1906. From 1908, he was assigned to the Navy General Staff and chaired a commission recording the events of the war. He was promoted to rear admiral in 1911, and to vice admiral in 1912 and chief of the Navy General Staff. Lieven was active in efforts to reconstruct the Imperial Russian Navy, but died near Udine railway station in Italy while returning from a vacation in Venice while aboard a train for St Petersburg. His grave was at his family estate in Courland.

== Awards ==
- Order of St Vladimir 4th degree
- Order of St Vladimir 3rd degree
- Order of St. Anne 3rd degree
- Order of St. Anne 2nd degree
- Order of St. Stanislaus 2nd degree
- Order of St. Stanislaus 1st degree

== Sources ==
- Kowner, Rotem (2006). Historical Dictionary of the Russo-Japanese War. The Scarecrow Press. ISBN 0-8108-4927-5.
