= Zentene Palace =

Palace in Latvia

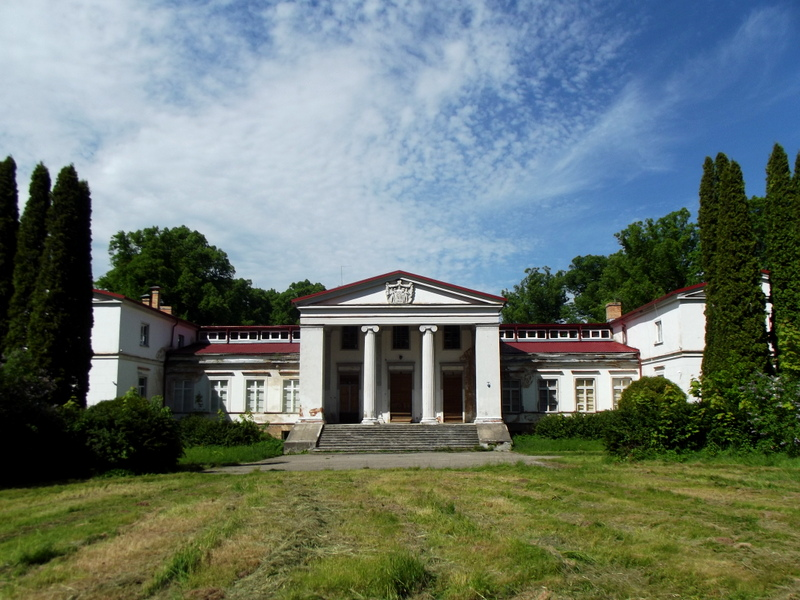

- Location within Latvia

General information
- Location: Tukums Municipality, Courland, Latvia
- Coordinates: 57°08′04″N 22°58′47″E
- Construction started: 1845
- Completed: 1850
- Client: Lieven family

Zentene Palace (German: Senten) is a manor house in the Zentene Parish of Tukums Municipality, in the Courland region of Latvia.

== History ==
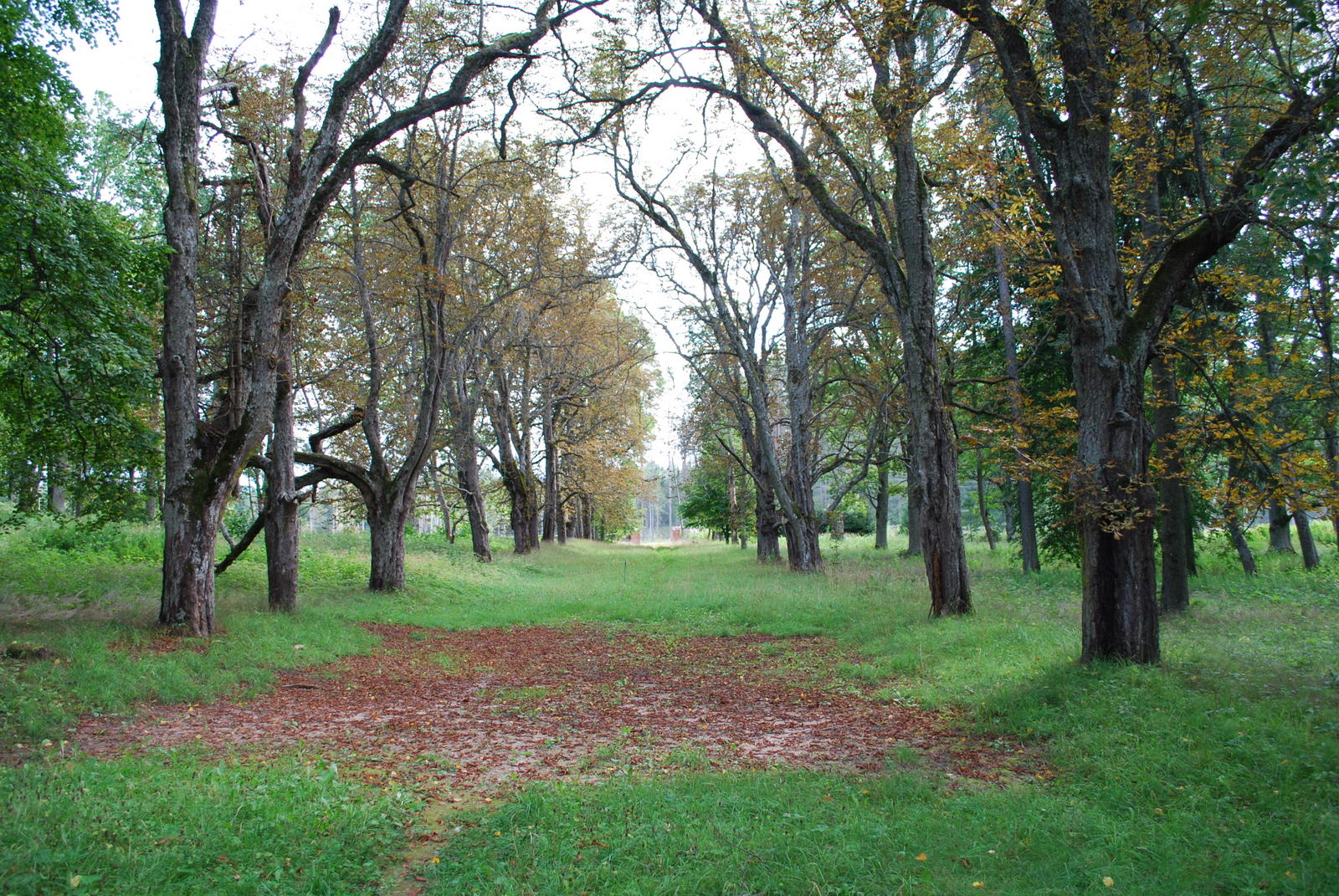
Park on Zentene estate.

Originally the courtyard buildings consisted of a stable, a servant's house and a barn. The manor house was built in Late Classicism style for prince Liven, based on the Berlin architectural school between 1845 and 1850.

The former owners of the Zentene estate were Philipp von der Brüggen around 1540, Prince von der Saken in 1818 and the Lieven family from then on. In the 1920s the building went into public ownership, and from 1938 it housed the Zentene School.

== See also ==
- List of palaces and manor houses in Latvia
