= John Hulsman =

American foreign policy expert (born 1967)

John C. Hulsman (born 1967) is an American foreign policy expert. He was the Alfred von Oppenheim Scholar in Residence at the German Council on Foreign Relations in Berlin.

Hulsman writes for the Aspen Institute of Italy and is senior research fellow at the Hague Centre for Strategic Studies. He used to work for The Heritage Foundation, where he was a senior research fellow in international relations there. He is president and co-founder of John C. Hulsman Enterprises, an international relations consulting firm. He has taught European security studies at the Johns Hopkins School of Advanced International Studies (SAIS), and world politics and U.S. foreign policy at the University of St. Andrews, Scotland.

Hulsman is the author of the books Ethical Realism, The Godfather Doctrine, and a biography of Lawrence of Arabia titled To Begin the World Over Again. He has been interviewed on C-SPAN, The Daily Show with Jon Stewart, ABC, CBS, Fox News, CNN, MSNBC, PBS, and the BBC.

== Bibliography ==
=== Books ===
- A Paradigm for the New World Order: A Schools of Thought Analysis of American Foreign Policy in the Post-Cold War Era (1997)
- The World Turned Rightside Up: A New US-UK Trading Agenda for the Age of Globalization (2001) with Patrick Minford
- Ethical Realism: A Vision for America’s Role in the World (2006) with Anatol Lieven
- To Begin the World Over Again: Lawrence of Arabia from Damascus to Baghdad (2009)
- The Godfather Doctrine: A Foreign Policy Parable (2009)
- Brexit: Directions for Britain Outside the EU (2015) with Robert Oulds
- To Dare More Boldly: The Audacious Story of Political Risk (2018)

=== Articles ===
- Raid on Trump’s house makes a Biden rematch more likely (2022) on Arab News
