= Elena Lieven =

British psychologist (born 1947)

Elena Lieven FBA (born 18 August 1947) is a British psychology and linguistics researcher and educator. She was a senior research scientist in the Department of Developmental and Comparative Psychology in Leipzig, Germany. She is also a professor in the School of Health Sciences at the University of Manchester where she is director of its Child Study Centre and leads the ESRC International Centre for Language and Communicative Development (LuCiD).

Lieven was named "Researcher of the Year" by the University of Manchester in 2015. She was elected Fellow of the British Academy (FBA) and the member of the Academia Europaea (MAE) in 2018.

== Early life and education ==
Elena Lieven is the sister of Anatol Lieven, Dominic Lieven, Michael Lieven, and Nathalie Lieven. Ancestors include Dorothea von Lieven and Christoph von Lieven, prominent members of Baltic German nobility.

Lieven attended More House School in London, graduating in 1963, then studying at City of Westminster College in London. She studied experimental psychology during her undergraduate years at New Hall, Cambridge, earning honors, and then studied language development during her doctoral studies at Cambridge.

== Career ==
After Cambridge, Lieven moved to the University of Manchester.

She was Editor of the Journal of Child Language for nearly ten years (1996–2005).

Her principal areas of research involve: usage-based approaches to language development; the emergence and construction of grammar; the relationship between input characteristics and the process of language development; and variation in children's communicative environments. She has been involved in the design and collection of naturalistic child language corpora initially funded by the Economic and Social Research Council (ESRC) and, more recently, has collected a number of dense databases funded by the Max Planck Institute.

Lieven was previously the president of the International Association for the Study of Child Language. Also, she is a member of The Chintang and Puma Documentation Project, a DOBES project funded by the Volkswagen Foundation aiming at the linguistic and ethnographic description of two endangered Sino-Tibetan languages of Nepal.

She has also been the director of the Child Study Centre; Centre lead for the Centre for Developmental Science and Disorders in the Institute of Brain, Behaviour and Mental Health; director of the ESRC International Centre for Language and Communicative Development (LuCiD) which was established jointly by the University of Manchester, University of Liverpool and University of Lancaster in 2014 on a five-year grant.

She has been designated an honorary professor at the University of Leipzig, and she has been a guest researcher at numerous universities, including the Max Planck Institute for Psycholinguistics, Nijmegen, the Netherlands; University of Barcelona, University of California, Berkeley, US; and La Trobe University, Melbourne, Australia.
