= Charlotte von Lieven =

Russian princess (1748–1828)

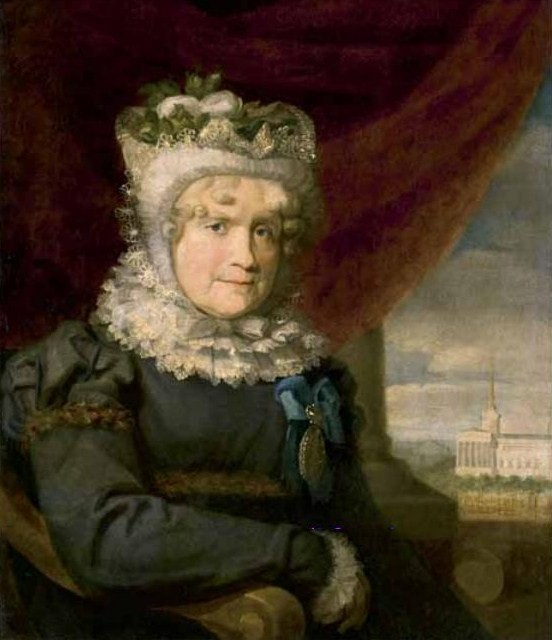
Portrait by George Dawe, 1821

Charlotte Margarete Fürstin von Lieven (née Baroness von Gaugreben; 1748–1828) was a Russian princess of German origin and an Imperial governess.

== Early life ==
She was born as daughter of Carl Caspar, Baron von Gaugreben (1716–1767) and Baroness Agnes Posse of Säby (b. 1727). Charlotte married Baron Otto Heinrich von Lieven (1726–1781), member of one of the oldest aristocratic families of German Baltic origin.

== Court life ==
She was in 1783 appointed by Grand Duke Paul with the task of educating his daughters and younger sons - Nicholas and Mikhail Pavlovich. Charlotte had a strong and influential position within the contemporary Russian court. On 22 August 1826, she was granted the hereditary title of Princess in the Russian Empire by Nicholas I, Emperor of Russia.

== Sources ==
- Alexander von Lieven: Der General Baron Otto Heinrich von Lieven und seine Gemahlin, die Staatsdame Charlotte geb. Freiin von Gaugreben, Fürstin. Riga 1915
