= Secret Protocol for the International War on Anarchism =

1904 international anti-anarchist agreement

The Secret Protocol for the International War on Anarchism, also known as the St. Petersburg Protocol, was an international agreement made on 1904 that arranged national policies for the rendition of anarchists to their origin countries and the exchange of surveilled information on anarchists. The United States was not signatory.

== Bibliography ==
- Barton, Mary S. (April 2015). "The Global War on Anarchism: The United States and International Anarchist Terrorism, 1898-1904". Diplomatic History. 39 (2): 303–330. doi:10.1093/dh/dhu004. ISSN 0145-2096.
- Deflem, Mathieu (2005). "'Wild Beasts Without Nationality': The Uncertain Origins of Interpol, 1898–1910". In Reichel, Philip L. (ed.). Handbook of Transnational Crime and Justice. Thousand Oaks, CA: Sage. pp. 275–285.
- Jensen, Richard Bach (1981). "The International Anti-Anarchist Conference of 1898 and the Origins of Interpol". Journal of Contemporary History. 16 (2): 323–347. doi:10.1177/002200948101600205. ISSN 0022-0094. JSTOR 260577.
- Jensen, Richard Bach (March 2001). "The United States, International Policing and the War against Anarchist Terrorism, 1900–1914". Terrorism and Political Violence. 13 (1): 15–46. doi:10.1080/09546550109609668. ISSN 0954-6553 – via Taylor & Francis.
- Jensen, Richard Bach (2014). The Battle Against Anarchist Terrorism: An International History, 1878–1934. Cambridge: Cambridge University Press. ISBN 978-1-107-03405-1.
- Jensen, Richard Bach (July 2017). "The Secret Agent, International Policing, and Anarchist Terrorism: 1900–1914". Terrorism and Political Violence. 29 (4): 735–771. doi:10.1080/09546553.2015.1050325. ISSN 0954-6553.
- Zuckerman, Fredric S. (2003). "Brothers in Arms? The Beginnings of International Police Co-operation and the Russian Revolutionary Emigration". The Tsarist Secret Police Abroad. Palgrave Macmillan. pp. 56–70. doi:10.1057/9780230514935_3. ISBN 1-4039-0438-3. LCCN 2002068340.
