= Anatol Lieven =

British author and political analyst

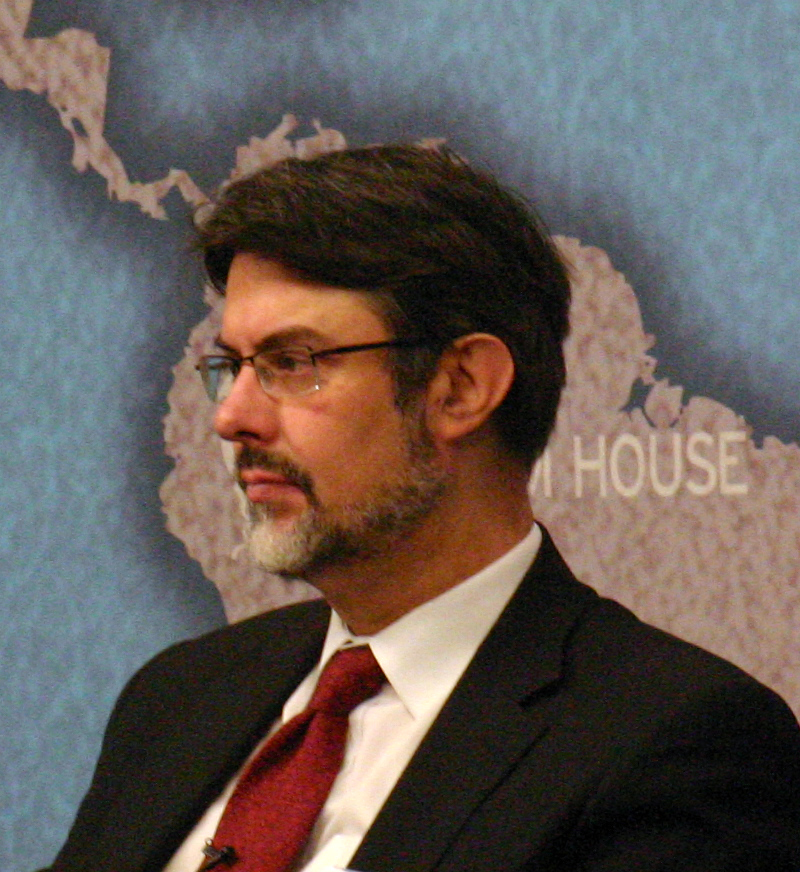
- Lieven in 2012
- Born: Peter Paul Anatol Lieven; 28 June 1960 (age 66); London, United Kingdom
- Occupations: 1986-1998 journalist; 1999-present academic
- Awards: George Orwell Prize for Political Writing (1994)

Academic background
- Education: Cambridge University

Academic work
- Notable works: Pakistan: A Hard Country; America Right or Wrong: An Anatomy of American Nationalism

Anatol Lieven (born 28 June 1960) is a British author, journalist, and policy analyst. Lieven is a visiting professor at King's College London, and is a senior fellow and the director of the Eurasia Program at the Quincy Institute for Responsible Statecraft. He is currently based in Washington, D.C.

== Early life ==
Peter Paul Anatol Lieven was born on 28 June 1960 in South London to Alexander Pavlovich Lieven and Veronica Eileen Mary Lieven (née Monahan). His siblings include Elena Lieven, Dominic Lieven, and Dame Nathalie Lieven. He attended the City of London School, and received a BA in history and a PhD in political science from Jesus College, Cambridge.

== Career ==
=== Journalist and academic ===
In the mid-1980s, Lieven was a journalist with the Financial Times covering Pakistan and Afghanistan, while also covering India as a freelancer. In the latter half of 1989, he covered the revolutions in Czechoslovakia and Romania for the Times. In 1990, he worked for The Times (London) covering the former USSR, during which time he covered the Chechen War (1994–1996). In 1998, he edited Strategic Comments at the International Institute for Strategic Studies in London, while also working for the Eastern Services of the BBC.

In 2000 through 2005, Lieven was a senior associate for foreign and security policy at the Carnegie Endowment for International Peace. Lieven served as chair of International Relations and Terrorism Studies at King's College London, where he remains a visiting professor. In 2006, Lieven became a professor at Georgetown University's School of Foreign Service at its campus in Qatar. Since 2005, Lieven has been a senior researcher (Bernard L. Schwartz fellow and American Strategy Program fellow) at the New America Foundation, where he focuses on US global strategy and the war on terrorism.

=== Book author ===
Lieven's 2011 book Pakistan: A Hard Country was based on Lieven's experiences of covering the country. Lisa Kaaki of Arab News said, "This book gives an insight into the soul of Pakistan, a country often misunderstood and wrongly portrayed in the media". The Independent called the book, "a finely researched blend of the nation's 64-year history."

Lieven's America Right or Wrong: An Anatomy of American Nationalism was published in 2004. In Foreign Affairs the book was described as "intelligent and often provocative" whilst in The Guardian the book was praised by Martin Woollacott who wrote: "It is Anatol Lieven's contention in this illuminating book that Bin Laden's assault on the United States stripped away many of the remaining restraints on the intolerant, irrational, and self-destructive side of American nationalism. Whether this nationalism is a greater problem than that represented by Islamic extremism is a moot point, but it is clear that the combination of the two could bring disaster on us all".

== Awards ==
- 1994: Orwell Prize for a political book, for The Baltic Revolution
- 1993: Notable Book of the Year by The New York Times Book Review
- 1993: Yale University Press Governors' Award for The Baltic Revolution

== Bibliography ==
- The Baltic Revolution: Estonia, Latvia, Lithuania and the Path to Independence (1993)
- Chechnya: Tombstone of Russian Power (1998)
- Ukraine and Russia: Fraternal Rivals (1999)
- America Right or Wrong: An Anatomy of American Nationalism (2004) (2012)
- Ethical Realism: A Vision for America’s Role in the World (2006) with John Hulsman
- Pakistan: A Hard Country (2011); as a Penguin pocketbook (2012)
- Climate Change and the Nation State (2020)
