= Resistance during World War II =

Irregular forces in World War II

During World War II, resistance movements operated in German-occupied Europe by a variety of means, ranging from non-cooperation to propaganda, hiding crashed pilots and even to outright warfare and the recapturing of towns. In many countries, resistance movements were sometimes also referred to as The Underground.

While resistance groups played a significant auxiliary role in harassing the enemy, their military impact was limited, and they were incapable of liberating their nations alone. Overall, the effectiveness of resistance movements during World War II is generally measured more by their political and moral impact than their decisive military contribution to the overall Allied victory.

== Assessment ==
By 1941, British assessment of Allied resistance groups suggested that although Nazi Germany now controlled much of Europe, only Czechoslovakia, Poland and (in Asia) China had considerable resistance networks. Although by 1942 resistance groups formed in most occupied territories, the assessments of effectiveness of large resistance networks such as Soviet partisans and French Resistance suggests that they did not significantly hamper German operations until late 1943. All resistance movements were also significantly dependent on support from Allied powers.

Resistance also encompassed activities beyond armed combat, such as sabotage, espionage, assisting escapees from Nazis, and other activities.

Overall assessment of resistance effectiveness is a matter of debate among historians. Jørgen Hæstrup argued that resistance activities "influenced the course of the War decisively [particularly] in the psychological sector". According to Evan Mawdsley, however, in military terms, "the resistance did not do a great deal to achieve the strategic objectives" of major Allied powers, failing (with few late war exceptions) to regain territory or tie-down frontline German troops. J. R. Seeger notes that in specific campaigns, the resistance was considered highly valuable, and on the "rare occasions" resistance forces were able to tie down German troops, this benefited conventional Allied forces in that theater, but often resulted in "horrific Nazi reprisals". Mawdsley does, however, acknowledge that the resistance movements played "a significant auxiliary role in the area of sabotage and the gathering of intelligence", and that the movements had "great political and moral (and propaganda) importance", translating to their subsequent significant impact on collective memory.

== By affiliation ==
The resistance movements in World War II can be broken down into two primary politically polarized camps:

- the internationalist and usually Communist Party-led anti-fascist resistance that existed in nearly every country in the world; and
- the various nationalist groups in German- or Soviet-occupied countries, such as the Republic of Poland, that opposed both Nazi Germany and the Communists.

== By territory ==
Among the most notable resistance movements were:

=== Europe ===
- The Albanian Resistance
- The Belgian Resistance
- The Bulgarian Resistance (led by the Fatherland Front)
- The Czech Resistance
- The Danish Resistance
- The Dutch Resistance (especially the "LO" national hiding organisation)
- The French Resistance
- The Greek Resistance
- The Italian Resistance (led mainly by the Italian CLN)
- The Jewish Resistance in various German-occupied territories
- The Norwegian Resistance
- The Polish Resistance (including the Polish Home Army and the greater Polish Underground State loyal to the government-in-exile and the People's Army loyal to the Soviet-backed government);
- Slovak National Uprising
- Soviet partisans^{[a]}
- Yugoslav Resistance
  - Chetniks
  - Yugoslav Partisans

And the politically persecuted opposition in Germany itself (there were 16 main resistance groups and at least 27 failed attempts to assassinate Hitler with many more planned, and defectors to the Soviet Union and the anti-Axis resistance in Greece and France, in the german-dutch border area there were some Dutch Resistance Groups with in Germany living german members).

=== Far East ===
- The Chinese resistance
- The Korean Resistance in the Japanese Korea and Manchukuo
- The Malayan resistance in occupied Malaya
- The Free Thai Movement

Many countries had resistance movements dedicated to fighting or undermining the Axis invaders, and Nazi Germany itself also had an anti-Nazi movement. Although Britain was not occupied during the war, the British made complex preparations for a British resistance movement. The main organisation was created by the Secret Intelligence Service (SIS, aka MI6) and is now known as Section VII. In addition there was a short-term secret commando force called the Auxiliary Units. Various organizations were also formed to establish foreign resistance cells or support existing resistance movements, like the British Special Operations Executive and the American Office of Strategic Services (the forerunner of the Central Intelligence Agency). There were also resistance movements fighting against Allied invaders. In Italian East Africa, after the Italians were defeated during the East African Campaign, some Italian soldiers and settlers participated in a guerrilla war against the Allies from 1941 to 1943. Though the Werwolf Nazi German resistance movement never amounted to much, the German Volkssturm played an extensive role in the Battle of Berlin. The "Forest Brothers" of Estonia, Latvia and Lithuania included many fighters who operated against the Soviet occupation of the Baltic States into the 1960s. During or after the war, similar anti-Soviet resistance rose up in places like Romania, Poland, Bulgaria, Ukraine, and Chechnya.

== Organization ==
After the first shock following the Blitzkrieg, people slowly started organizing, both locally and on a larger scale, especially when Jews and other groups began to be deported and used as Arbeitseinsatz (forced labor for the Germans). Organization was dangerous, so most resistance actions were performed by individuals. The possibilities heavily depended on the terrain; where there were large tracts of uninhabited land, especially hills and forests, resistance forces could more easily organise undetected; this particularly favoured Soviet partisans in Eastern Europe. In more densely populated countries such as the Netherlands, the Biesbosch wilderness was used. In northern Italy, both the Alps and the Apennines offered shelter to partisan brigades, though many groups operated directly inside the major cities.

There were many different types of groups, ranging in activity from humanitarian aid to armed resistance, who sometimes cooperated in varying degrees. Resistance usually arose spontaneously, but was encouraged and helped along by London and Moscow.

== Size ==
While historians and governments of some European countries have attempted to portray resistance to Nazi occupation as widespread among their populations, only a small minority of people participated in organized resistance, estimated at one to three percent of the population of countries in western Europe. In eastern Europe where Nazi rule was more oppressive, a larger percentage of people were in organized resistance movements, for example, an estimated 10-15 percent of the Polish population. Passive resistance by non-cooperation with the occupiers was much more common. Greece, Yugoslavia, Poland, and Ukraine had large numbers of resistors to the German occupation. In western Europe, where the German hand was less oppressive, the resistors were fewer. However, in the west, according to historian Tony Judt, the "myth of resistance mattered most."

A number of sources note that the Polish Home Army was the largest resistance movement in Nazi-occupied Europe. Norman Davies writes that the "Armia Krajowa (Home Army), the AK,... could fairly claim to be the largest of European resistance [organizations]." Gregor Dallas writes that the "Home Army (Armia Krajowa or AK) in late 1943 numbered around 400,000, making it the largest resistance organization in Europe." Mark Wyman writes that the "Armia Krajowa was considered the largest underground resistance unit in wartime Europe." However, the numbers of Soviet partisans were very similar to those of the Polish resistance, as were the numbers of Yugoslav Partisans. For the French Resistance, François Marcot ventured an estimate of 200,000 activists and a further 300,000 with substantial involvement in Resistance operations. For the Resistance in Italy, Giovanni di Capua estimates that, by August 1944, the number of partisans reached around 100,000, and it escalated to more than 250,000 with the final insurrection in April 1945.

== Forms of resistance ==
Various forms of resistance were:

- Armed
  - raids on distribution offices to get food coupons or various documents such as Ausweise or on birth registry offices to get rid of information about Jews and others to whom the Nazis paid special attention
  - assassinations
  - temporary liberation of areas, such as in Yugoslavia, Paris, and northern Italy, occasionally in cooperation with the Allied forces
  - uprisings such as in Warsaw in 1943 and 1944, and in extermination camps such as in Sobibor in 1943 and Auschwitz in 1944
  - continuing battle and guerrilla warfare, such as the partisans in the USSR and Yugoslavia and the Maquis in France
- Non-violent
  - Sabotage – a wide range of covert and irregular operations undertaken by resistance movements, intelligence agencies, and military special forces
  - Strikes and demonstrations
  - Espionage, including sending reports of military importance (e.g. troop movements, weather reports etc.)
  - Underground press to counter Nazi propaganda and spread Anti-Nazi propaganda
  - Covert listening to BBC broadcasts for news bulletins and coded messages
  - Political resistance to prepare for the reorganization after the war
  - Helping people to go into hiding (e.g., to escape the Arbeitseinsatz or deportation)—this was one of the main activities in the Netherlands, due to the large number of Jews and the high level of administration, which made it easy for the Germans to identify Jews.
  - Escape and evasion lines to help Allied military personnel caught behind Axis lines and helping POWs with illegal supplies, breakouts, communication, etc.
  - Forgery of documents
  - Assistance to resistance operatives
  - Gathering and provision of supplies to families of victims of Axis repression

== Resistance operations ==
=== 1939–1940 ===
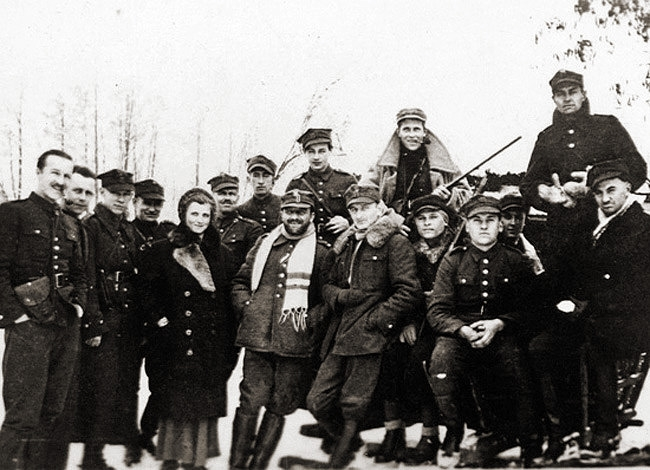
The first partisan of World War II Hubal and his unit in Poland in winter 1939

On 15 September 1939, a member of the Czech resistance movement, Ctibor Novák, planted explosive devices in Berlin. His first bomb detonated in front of the Ministry of Aeronautics, and the second detonated in front of police headquarters. Both buildings were damaged and many Germans were injured.

On 28 October 1939 (the anniversary of the establishment of Czechoslovakia in 1918), there were large demonstrations against Nazi occupation in Prague, with about 100,000 Czechs. Demonstrators crowded the streets in the city. German police had to disperse the demonstrators, and began shooting in the evening. The first victim was baker Václav Sedláček, who was shot dead. The second victim was student Jan Opletal, who was critically injured, and died on 11 November. Another 15 people were badly injured and hundreds of people sustained minor injuries. About 400 people were arrested.

In March 1940, a partisan unit of the first guerilla organization of the Second World War in Europe, the Detached Unit of the Polish Army, led by Major Henryk Dobrzański (Hubal), defeated a battalion of German infantry in a skirmish near the Polish village of Hucisko. A few days later in an ambush near the village of Szałasy it inflicted heavy casualties upon another German unit. As time progressed, resistance forces grew in size and number. To counter this threat, the German authorities formed a special 1,000 man-strong anti-partisan unit of combined SS-Wehrmacht forces, including a Panzer group. Although Dobrzański's unit never exceeded 300 men, the Germans fielded at least 8,000 men in the area to secure it.

In 1940, Witold Pilecki, of the Polish resistance, presented to his superiors a plan to enter Germany's Auschwitz concentration camp, gather intelligence on the camp from the inside, and organize inmate resistance. The Home Army approved this plan and provided him with a false identity card, and on 19 September 1940 he deliberately went out during a street roundup in Warsaw-łapanka, and was caught by the Germans along with other civilians and sent to Auschwitz. In the camp he organized the underground organization Związek Organizacji Wojskowej (ZOW). From October 1940, ZOW sent the first reports about the camp and its genocide to Home Army Headquarters in Warsaw through the resistance network organized in Auschwitz.

On the night of January 21–22, 1940, in the Soviet-occupied Podolian town of Czortków, the Czortków Uprising started. It was the first Polish uprising and the first anti-Soviet uprising of World War II. Anti-Soviet Poles, most of them teenagers from local high schools, stormed the local Red Army barracks and a prison, in order to release Polish soldiers kept there.

1940 was the year of establishing the Warsaw Ghetto and the infamous Auschwitz-Birkenau death camp by the German Nazis in occupied Poland. Among the many activities of Polish resistance and Polish people was helping endangered Jews. Polish citizens have the world's highest count of individuals who have been recognized as Righteous Among the Nations by Yad Vashem as non-Jews who risked their lives to save Jews from extermination during the Holocaust.

One of the events that helped the growth of the French Resistance was the targeting of the French Jews, Communists, Romani, homosexuals, Catholics, and others, forcing many into hiding. This in turn gave the French Resistance new people to incorporate into their political structures.

Around May 1940, a resistance group formed around the Austrian priest Heinrich Maier, who until 1944 very successfully passed on the plans and production locations for V-2 rockets, Tiger tanks and airplanes (Messerschmitt Bf 109, Messerschmitt Me 163 Komet, etc.) to the Allies so that they could target these important factories for destruction; the group also planned for the Central European states' post-war. Very early on they passed on information about the mass murder of the Jews to the Allies.

The Special Operations Executive (SOE) was a British World War II organisation. With Cabinet approval, it was officially formed by Minister of Economic Warfare Hugh Dalton on 22 July 1940, to develop a spirit of resistance in the occupied countries and to prepare a fifth column of resistance fighters to engage in open opposition to the occupiers when the United Kingdom was able to return to the continent. To aid in the transport of agents and the supply of the resistance fighters, a Royal Air Force Special Duty Service was developed. Whereas the SIS was primarily involved in espionage, the SOE and the resistance fighters were geared toward reconnaissance of German defenses and sabotage. In England the SOE was also involved in the formation of the Auxiliary Units, a top secret stay-behind resistance organisation which would have been activated in the event of a German invasion of Britain. The SOE operated in all countries or former countries occupied by or attacked by the Axis forces, except where demarcation lines were agreed with Britain's principal allies (the Soviet Union and the United States).

The organisation was officially dissolved on 15 January 1946.

=== 1941 ===
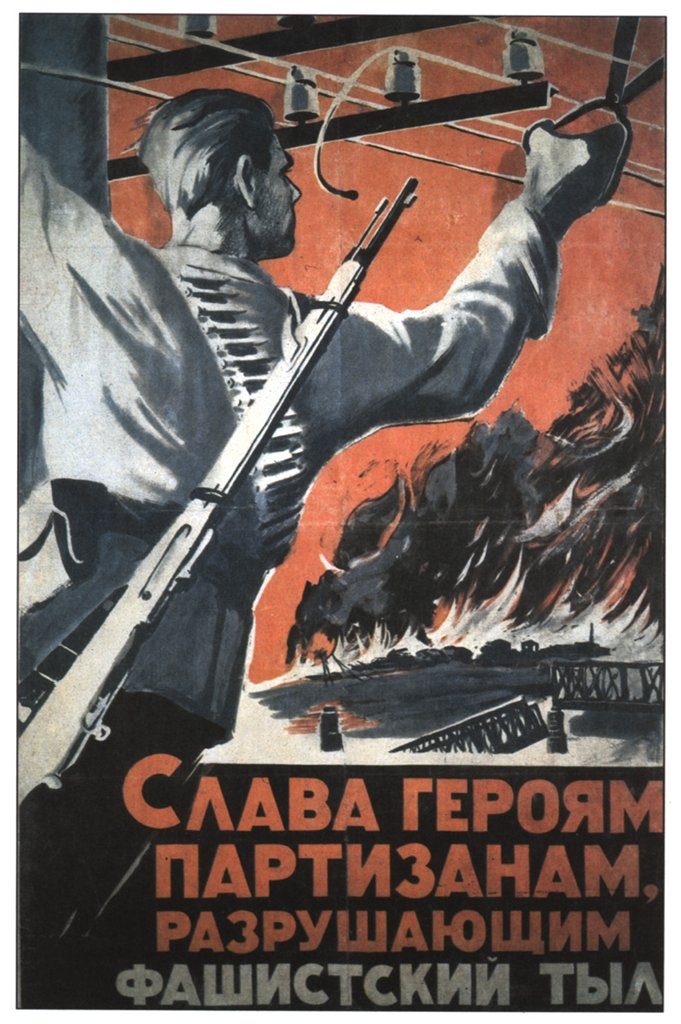
A 1941 Soviet poster, inviting disruption of the enemy rear and active resistance at the German-occupied territories

In February 1941, the Dutch Communist Party organized a general strike in Amsterdam and surrounding cities, known as the February strike, in protest against anti-Jewish measures by the Nazi occupying force and violence by fascist street fighters against Jews. Several hundreds of thousands of people participated in the strike. The strike was put down by the Nazis and some participants were executed.

In April 1941, the Liberation Front of the Slovene Nation was established in the Province of Ljubljana. Its armed wing were the Slovene Partisans. It represented both the working class and the Slovene ethnicity.

From April 1941, Bureau of Information and Propaganda of the Union for Armed Struggle started in Poland Operation N headed by Tadeusz Żenczykowski. Action consisted of sabotage, subversion and black-propaganda activities carried out by the Polish resistance against Nazi German occupation forces during World War II

Beginning in March 1941, Witold Pilecki's reports were being forwarded via the Polish resistance to the Polish government in exile and through it, to the British government in London and other Allied governments. These reports were the first information about the Holocaust and the principal source of intelligence on Auschwitz for the Western Allies.

In May 1941, the Resistance Team "Elevtheria" (Freedom) was established in Thessaloniki by politicians Paraskevas Barbas, Apostolos Tzanis, Ioannis Passalidis, Simos Kerasidis, Athanasios Fidas, Ioannis Evthimiadis and military officer Dimitrios Psarros. Its armed wing comprised two armed forces; Athanasios Diakos led by Christodoulos Moschos (captain "Petros"), operating in Kroussia; and Odysseas Androutsos led by Athanasios Genios (captain "Lassanis"), operating in Visaltia.

The first anti-soviet uprising during World War II began on June 22, 1941 (the start-date of Operation Barbarossa) in Lithuania. On the same day, the Sisak People's Liberation Partisan Detachment was formed in Croatia, near the town of Sisak. It was the first armed partisan unit in Croatia.

Communist-initiated uprising against Axis started in German-occupied Serbia on July 7, 1941, and six days later in Montenegro. The Republic of Užice (Ужичка република) was a short-lived liberated Yugoslav territory, the first part of occupied Europe to be liberated. Organized as a military mini-state it existed throughout the autumn of 1941 in the western part of Serbia. The Republic was established by the Partisan resistance movement and its administrative center was in the town of Užice. The government was made of "people's councils" (odbors), and the Communists opened schools and published a newspaper, Borba (meaning "Struggle"). They even managed to run a postal system and around 145 km (90 mi) of railway and operated an ammunition factory from the vaults beneath the bank in Užice.

In July 1941, Mieczysław Słowikowski (using the codename "Rygor"—Polish for "Rigor") set up "Agency Africa," one of World War II's most successful intelligence organizations. His Polish allies in these endeavors included Lt. Col. Gwido Langer and Major Maksymilian Ciężki. The information gathered by the Agency was used by the Americans and British in planning the amphibious November 1942 Operation Torch landings in North Africa.

On 13 July 1941, in Italian-occupied Montenegro, Montenegrin separatist Sekula Drljević proclaimed an independent Kingdom of Montenegro as an Italian governorate, upon which a nationwide rebellion escalated raised by Partisans, Yugoslav Royal officers and various other armed personnel. It was the first organized armed uprising in then occupied Europe, and involved 32,000 people. Most of Montenegro was quickly liberated, except major cities where Italian forces were well fortified. On 12 August — after a major Italian offensive involving 5 divisions and 30,000 soldiers — the uprising collapsed as units were disintegrating; poor leadership occurred as well as collaboration. The final toll of July 13 uprising in Montenegro was 735 dead, 1120 wounded and 2070 captured Italians and 72 dead and 53 wounded Montenegrins.

In response to the Genocide of Serbs in the Independent State of Croatia, Serb civilians, Chetniks and Yugoslav Partisans instigated uprisings in Eastern Herzegovina and the region of Lika from June–September, 1941.

In the Battle of Loznica, 31 August 1941, Chetniks attacked and freed the town of Loznica in German-occupied Serbia from the Germans. Several Germans were killed and wounded; 93 were captured. This marked the first time a town was liberated in occupied Europe.

On 11 October 1941, in Bulgarian-occupied Prilep, Macedonians attacked post of the Bulgarian occupation police, which was the start of Macedonian resistance against the fascists who occupied Macedonia: Germans, Italians, Bulgarians and Albanians. The resistance finished successfully in August–November 1944 when the independent Macedonian state was formed, which was later added to the Federal People's Republic of Yugoslavia.

At the time Hitler gave his anti-resistance Nacht und Nebel decree – the very day of the Attack on Pearl Harbor in the Pacific – the planning for Britain's Operation Anthropoid was underway, as a resistance move to assassinate Reinhard Heydrich, the Deputy Protector of Bohemia and Moravia and the chief of the Final Solution, by the Czech resistance in Prague. Over fifteen thousand Czechs were killed in reprisals, with the most infamous incidents being the complete destruction of the towns of Lidice and Ležáky.

=== 1942 ===
On February 16, 1942, the Greek Communist Party (KKE)-led National Liberation Front gave permission to a communist veteran, Athanasios (Thanasis) Klaras (later known as Aris Velouchiotis) to examine the possibilities of an armed resistance movement, which led to the formation of the Greek People's Liberation Army (ELAS). ELAS initiated actions against the German and Italian forces of occupation in Greece on 7 June 1942. The ELAS grew to become the largest resistance movement against the fascists in Greece.

The Luxembourgish general strike of 1942 was a passive resistance movement organised within a short time period to protest against a directive that incorporated the Luxembourg youth into the Wehrmacht. A national general strike, originating mainly in Wiltz, paralysed the country and forced the occupying German authorities to respond violently by sentencing 21 strikers to death.

On 27 May 1942 Operation Anthropoid took place. Two armed Czechoslovak members of the army in exile (Jan Kubiš and Jozef Gabčík) attempted to assassinate the SS-obergruppenführer Reinhard Heydrich. Heydrich was not killed on the spot but died later at the hospital from his wounds. He is the highest ranked Nazi to have been assassinated during the war.

In September 1942, the Council to Aid Jews (Żegota) was founded by Zofia Kossak-Szczucka and Wanda Krahelska-Filipowicz ("Alinka") and made up of Polish Democrats as well as other Catholic activists. Poland was the only country in occupied Europe where there existed such a dedicated secret organization. Half of the Jews who survived the war (thus over 50,000) were aided in some shape or form by Żegota. The most known activist of Żegota was Irena Sendler head of the children's division who saved 2,500 Jewish children by smuggling them out of the Warsaw Ghetto, providing them false documents, and sheltering them in individual and group children's homes outside the ghetto.

On the night of 7–8 October 1942, Operation Wieniec started. It targeted rail infrastructure near Warsaw. Similar operations aimed at disrupting German transport and communication in occupied Poland occurred in the coming months and years. It targeted railroads, bridges and supply depots, primarily near transport hubs such as Warsaw and Lublin.

On 25 November, Greek guerrillas with the help of twelve British saboteurs carried out a successful operation which disrupted the German ammunition transportation to the German Africa Corps under Rommel—the destruction of Gorgopotamos bridge (Operation Harling).

On 20 June 1942, the most spectacular escape from Auschwitz concentration camp took place. Four Poles, Eugeniusz Bendera, Kazimierz Piechowski, Stanisław Gustaw Jaster and Józef Lempart made a daring escape. The escapees were dressed as members of the SS-Totenkopfverbände, fully armed and in an SS staff car. They drove out the main gate in a stolen Rudolf Hoss automobile Steyr 220 with a smuggled report from Witold Pilecki about the Holocaust. The Germans never recaptured any of them.

The Zamość Uprising was an armed uprising of Armia Krajowa and Bataliony Chłopskie against the forced expulsion of Poles from the Zamość region (Zamość Lands, Zamojszczyzna) under the Nazi Generalplan Ost. Nazi Germans attempting to remove the local Poles from the Greater Zamosc area (through forced removal, transfer to forced labor camps, or, in rare cases, mass murder) to get it ready for German colonization. It lasted from 1942 to 1944, and despite heavy casualties suffered by the Underground, the Germans failed.

=== 1943 ===
By the middle of 1943 partisan resistance to the Germans and their allies had grown from the dimensions of a mere nuisance to those of a major factor in the general situation. In many parts of occupied Europe Germany was suffering losses at the hands of partisans that he could ill afford. Nowhere were these losses heavier than in Yugoslavia.

— Basil Davidson

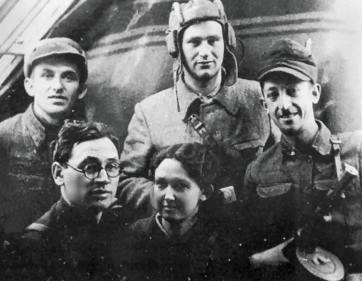
Belorussia, 1943. A Jewish partisan group of the Chkalov Brigade

In early January 1943, the 20,000 strong main operational group of the Yugoslav Partisans, stationed in western Bosnia, came under ferocious attack by over 150,000 German and Axis troops, supported by about 200 Luftwaffe aircraft in what became known as the Battle of the Neretva (the German codename was "Fall Weiss" or "Case White"). The Axis rallied eleven divisions, six German, three Italian, and two divisions of the Independent State of Croatia (supported by Ustaše formations) as well as a number of Chetnik brigades. The goal was to destroy the Partisan HQ and main field hospital (all Partisan wounded and prisoners faced certain execution), but this was thwarted by the diversion and retreat across the Neretva river, planned by the Partisan Supreme Command led by Marshal Josip Broz Tito. The main Partisan force escaped into Serbia.

On 19 April 1943, three members of the Belgian resistance movement were able to stop the Twentieth convoy, which was the 20th prisoner transport in Belgium organised by the Germans during World War II. The exceptional action by members of the Belgian resistance occurred to free Jewish and Romani ("Gypsy") civilians who were being transported by train from the Dossin army base located in Mechelen, Belgium to the concentration camp Auschwitz. The 20th train convoy transported 1,631 Jews (men, women and children). Some of the prisoners were able to escape and marked this particular kind of liberation action by the Belgian resistance movement as unique in the European history of the Holocaust.

One of the bravest and most significant displays of public defiance against the Nazis is the rescue of the Danish Jews in October 1943. Nearly all of the Danish Jews were saved from concentration camps by the Danish resistance. However, the action was largely due to the personal intervention of German diplomat Georg Ferdinand Duckwitz, who both leaked news of the intended round up of the Jews to both the Danish opposition and Jewish groups and negotiated with the Swedes to ensure Danish Jews would be accepted in Sweden.

On 13 June 1943, the Ukrainian Insurgent Army (UPA), organized mainly by the Banderite faction of the far-right Organisation of Ukrainian Nationalists which collaborated with the Nazis until July 1941, liberated a territory in Volyn from the Nazis and established the so-called Kolky Republic. The UPA reopened the local power station, bakery, dairy, post office, school, and set up an administration. The "republic" existed until 3 November 1943, when it was liquidated by the Nazis with the help of paratroopers, aircraft and armored vehicles.

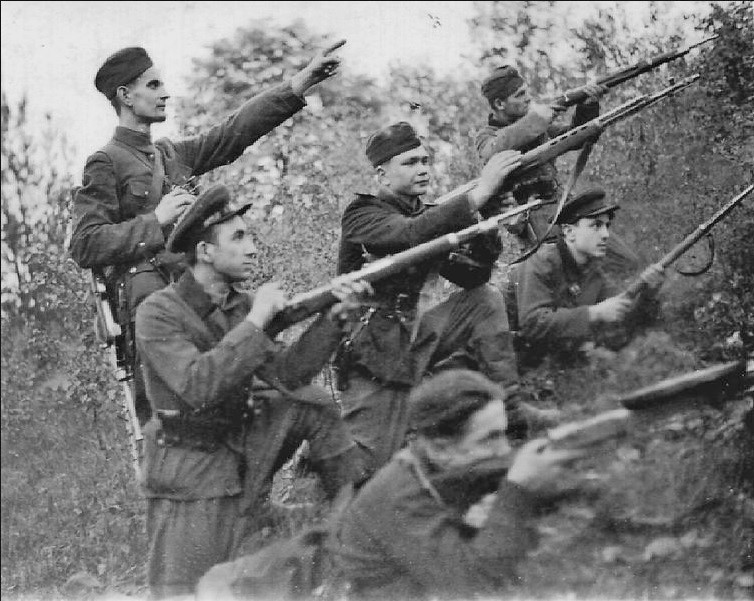
Ukrainian Insurgent Army in December 1943

The Battle of Sutjeska from 15 May – 16 June 1943 was a joint attack of the Axis forces that once again attempted to destroy the main Yugoslav Partisan force, near the Sutjeska river in southeastern Bosnia. The Axis rallied 127,000 troops for the offensive, including German, Italian, NDH, Bulgarian and Cossack units, as well as over 300 airplanes (under German operational command), against 18,000 soldiers of the primary Yugoslav Partisans operational group organised in 16 brigades. Facing almost exclusively German troops in the final encirclement, the Yugoslav Partisans finally succeeded in breaking out across the Sutjeska river through the lines of the German 118th Jäger Division, 104th Jäger Division and 369th (Croatian) Infantry Division in the northwestern direction, towards eastern Bosnia. Three brigades and the central hospital with over 2,000 wounded remained surrounded and, following Hitler's instructions, German commander-in-chief General Alexander Löhr ordered and carried out their annihilation, including the wounded and unarmed medical personnel. In addition, Partisan troops suffered from a severe lack of food and medical supplies, and many were struck down by typhoid. However, the failure of the offensive marked a turning point for Yugoslavia during World War II.

Operation Heads started—an action of serial assassinations of the Nazi personnel sentenced to death by the Underground court for crimes against Polish citizens in occupied Poland. The Resistance fighters of Polish Home Army's unit Agat killed Franz Bürkl during Operation Bürkl. Bürkl was a high-ranking Nazi German SS and secret police officer responsible for the murder and brutal interrogation of thousands of Polish Jews and Polish resistance fighters and supporters.

The Warsaw Ghetto Uprising by the Jews of the Warsaw Ghetto lasted from 19 April-16 May, and cost the Nazi forces 17 dead and 93 wounded by their own count, though some Jewish resistance figures claimed that German casualties were far higher.

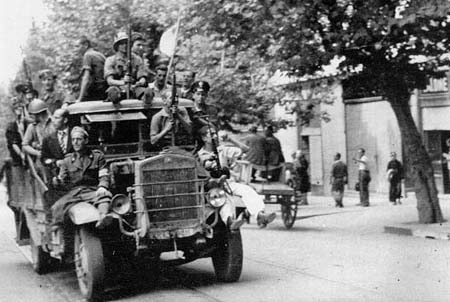
Italy, 1943. Italian partisans celebrating the liberation of Naples

On 30 September the German forces occupying the Italian city of Naples were forced out by the townsfolk and the Italian Resistance before the arrival of the first Allied forces in the city on 1 October. This popular uprising is known as the Four days of Naples.

On October 9, 1943, the Kinabalu guerillas launched the Jesselton Revolt against the Japanese occupation of British Borneo.

From November 1943, Operation Most III started. The Armia Krajowa provided the Allies with crucial intelligence on the German V-2 rocket. In effect, some 50 kg (110 lb) of the most important parts of the captured V-2, as well as the final report, analyses, sketches and photos, were transported to Brindisi by a Royal Air Force Douglas Dakota aircraft. In late July 1944, the V-2 parts were delivered to London.

=== 1944 ===
On 1 February 1944, the Resistance fighters of the Polish Home Army's unit Agat executed Franz Kutschera, SS and Reich's Police Chief in Warsaw in an action known as Operation Kutschera.

In the spring of 1944, a plan was laid out by the Allies to kidnap General Müller, whose harsh repressive measures had earned him the nickname "the Butcher of Crete". The operation was led by Major Patrick Leigh Fermor, together with Captain W. Stanley Moss, Greek SOE agents and Cretan resistance fighters. However, Müller left the island before the plan could be carried out. Undeterred, Fermor decided to abduct General Heinrich Kreipe instead.

On the night of 26 April, General Kreipe left his headquarters in Archanes and headed without escort to his well-guarded residence, "Villa Ariadni", approximately 25 km outside Heraklion. Major Fermor and Captain Moss, dressed as German military policemen, waited for him 1 km (0.62 mi) before his residence. They asked the driver to stop and asked for their papers. As soon as the car stopped, Fermor quickly opened Kreipe's door, rushed in and threatened him with his guns while Moss took the driver's seat. After driving some distance the British left the car, with suitable decoy material being planted that suggesting an escape off the island had been made by submarine, and with the General began a cross-country march. Hunted by German patrols, the group moved across the mountains to reach the southern side of the island, where a British Motor Launch (ML 842, commanded by Brian Coleman) was to pick them up. Eventually, on 14 May 1944, they were picked up (from Peristeres beach near Rhodakino) and transferred to Egypt.

In April–May 1944, the SS launched the daring airborne Raid on Drvar aimed at capturing Marshal Josip Broz Tito, the commander-in-chief of the Yugoslav Partisans, as well as disrupting their leadership and command structure. The Partisan headquarters were in the hills near Drvar, Bosnia at the time. The representatives of the Allies, Britain's Randolph Churchill and Evelyn Waugh, were also present. Elite German SS parachute commando units fought their way to Tito's cave headquarters and exchanged heavy gunfire resulting in numerous casualties on both sides. Chetniks under Draža Mihailović also flocked to the firefight in their own attempt to capture Tito. By the time German forces had penetrated to the cave, however, Tito had already fled the scene. He had a train waiting for him that took him to the town of Jajce. It would appear that Tito and his staff were well prepared for emergencies. The commandos were only able to retrieve Tito's marshal's uniform, which was later displayed in Vienna. After fierce fighting in and around the villager's cemetery, the Germans were able to link up with mountain troops. By that time, Tito, his British guests and Partisan survivors were fêted aboard the Royal Navy destroyer HMS Blackmore and her captain Lt. Carson, RN.

An intricate series of resistance operations were launched in France prior to, and during, Operation Overlord. On June 5, 1944, the BBC broadcast a group of unusual sentences, which the Germans knew were code words—possibly for the invasion of Normandy. The BBC would regularly transmit hundreds of personal messages, of which only a few were really significant. A few days before D-Day, the commanding officers of the Resistance heard the first line of Verlaine's poem, "Chanson d'automne", "Les sanglots longs des violons de l'automne" (Long sobs of autumn violins) which meant that the "day" was imminent. When the second line "Blessent mon cœur d'une langueur monotone" (wound my heart with a monotonous languor) was heard, the Resistance knew that the invasion would take place within the next 48 hours. They then knew it was time to go about their respective pre-assigned missions. All over France resistance groups had been coordinated, and various groups throughout the country increased their sabotage. Communications were cut, trains derailed, roads, water towers and ammunition depots destroyed and German garrisons were attacked. Some relayed info about German defensive positions on the beaches of Normandy to American and British commanders by radio, just prior to 6 June. Victory did not come easily; in June and July, in the Vercors plateau a newly reinforced maquis group fought more than 10,000 German soldiers (no Waffen-SS) under General Karl Pflaum and was defeated, with 840 casualties (639 fighters and 201 civilians). Following the Tulle Murders, Major Otto Diekmann's Waffen-SS company wiped out the village of Oradour-sur-Glane on 10 June. The resistance also assisted the later Allied invasion in the south of France (Operation Dragoon). They started insurrections in cities such as Paris when allied forces came close.

Operation Halyard, which took place between August and December 1944, was an Allied airlift operation behind enemy lines during World War II conducted by Chetniks in occupied Yugoslavia. In July 1944, the Office of Strategic Services (OSS) drew up plans to send a team to Chetniks led by General Draža Mihailović in the German-occupied Territory of the Military Commander in Serbia for the purpose of evacuating Allied airmen shot down over that area. This team, known as the Halyard team, was commanded by Lieutenant George Musulin, along with Master Sergeant Michael Rajacich, and Specialist Arthur Jibilian, the radio operator. The team was detailed to the United States Fifteenth Air Force and designated as the 1st Air Crew Rescue Unit. It was the largest rescue operation of American Airmen in history. According to historian Professor Jozo Tomasevich, a report submitted to the OSS showed that 417 Allied airmen who had been downed over occupied Yugoslavia were rescued by Mihailović's Chetniks, and airlifted out by the Fifteenth Air Force. According to Lt. Cmdr. Richard M. Kelly (OSS) grand total of 432 U.S. and 80 Allied personnel were airlifted during the Halyard Mission.

Operation Tempest launched in Poland in 1944 would lead to several major actions by Armia Krajowa, most notable of them being the Warsaw Uprising that took place in between August 1 and October 2, and failed due to the Soviet refusal, due to differences in ideology, to help; another one was Operation Ostra Brama: the Armia Krajowa or Home Army turned the weapons given to them by the Nazi Germans (in hope that they would fight the incoming Soviets) against the Nazi Germans—in the end the Home Army together with the Soviet troops took over the Greater Vilnius area to the dismay of the Lithuanians.

On 25 June 1944, the Battle of Osuchy started—one of the largest battles between the Polish resistance and Nazi Germany in occupied Poland during World War II, essentially a continuation of the Zamosc Uprising. During Operation Most III, in 1944, the Polish Home Army or Armia Krajowa provided the British with the parts of the V-2 rocket.

Norwegian sabotages of the German nuclear program drew to a close after three years on 20 February 1944, with the saboteur bombing of the ferry SF Hydro. The ferry was to carry railway cars with heavy water drums from the Vemork hydroelectric plant, where they were produced, across Lake Tinn so they could be shipped to Germany. Its sinking effectively ended Nazi nuclear ambitions. The series of raids on the plant was later dubbed by the British SOE as the most successful act of sabotage in all of World War II, and was used as a basis for the US war movie The Heroes of Telemark.

As an initiation of their uprising, Slovak rebels entered Banská Bystrica on the morning of 30 August 1944, the second day of the rebellion, and made it their headquarters. By 10 September, the insurgents gained control of large areas of central and eastern Slovakia. That included two captured airfields. As a result of the two-week-old insurgency, the Soviet Air Force was able to begin flying in equipment to Slovak and Soviet partisans.

On 9 September 1944, the Communist-led partisan movement in Bulgaria organized to fight the Bulgarian pro-Axis authorities and the Wehrmacht overthrew the pro-Axis government of Bulgaria. This led to Bulgaria switching sides in World War II from the Axis to the Allies and to the Soviet invasion of Bulgaria which resulted in the establishment of the Stalinist regime in Bulgaria after the war.

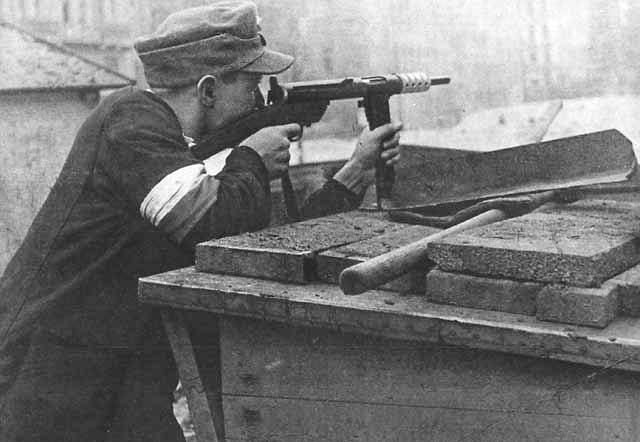
Member of the Polish Home Army defending a barricade in Warsaw's Powiśle district during the Warsaw Uprising, August 1944

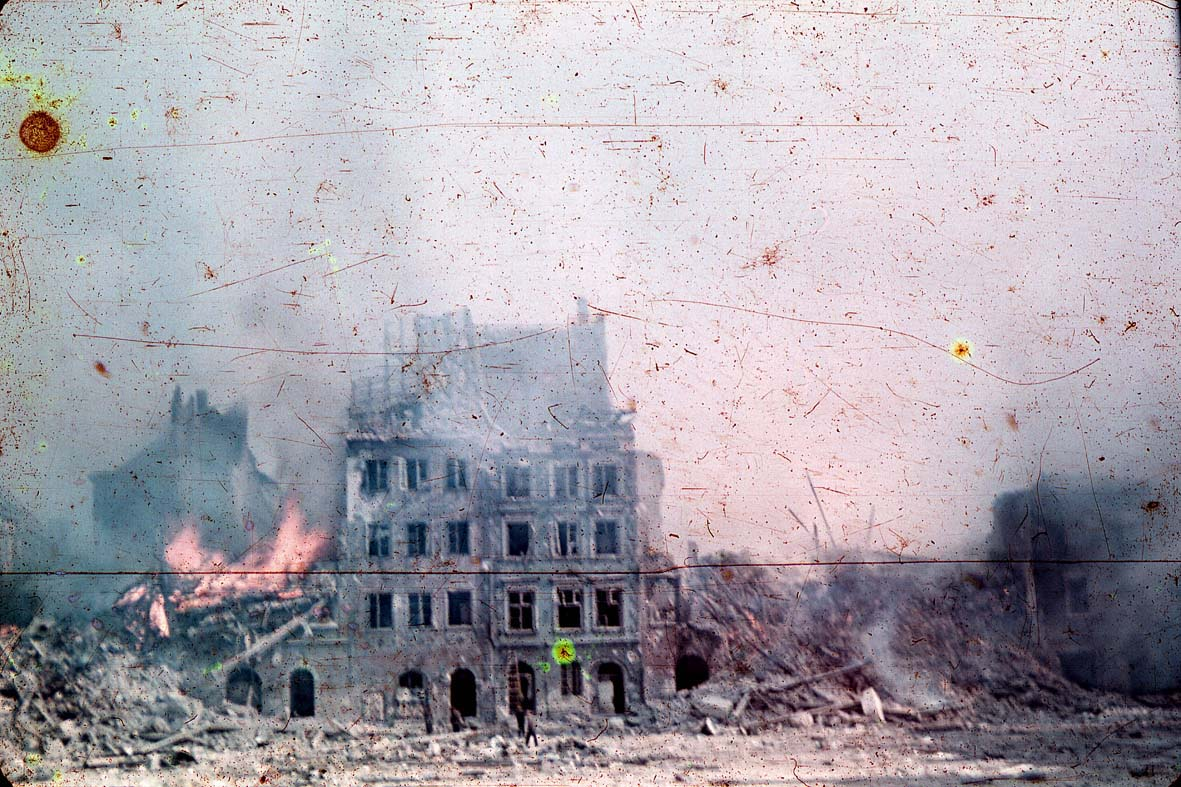
Warsaw Uprising, August 1944

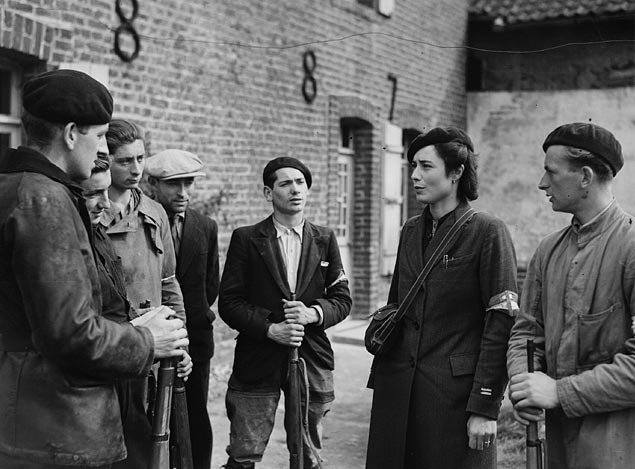
Members of the French resistance group Maquis in La Tresorerie, 14 September 1944, Boulogne

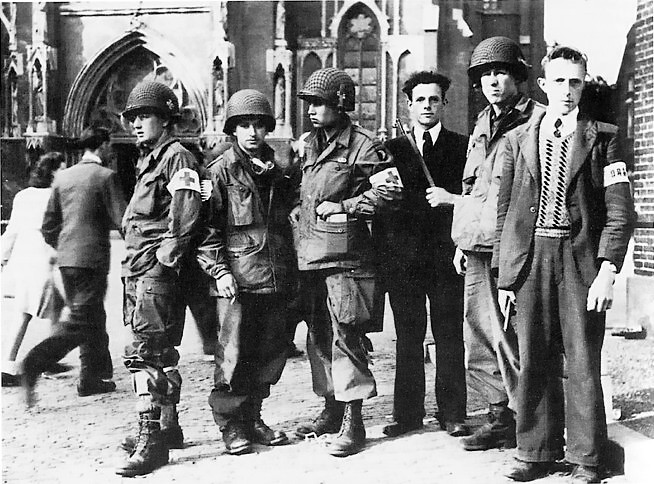
Members of the Dutch Resistance with troops of the US 101st Airborne Division in front of the Lambertus church in Veghel during Operation Market Garden, September 1944

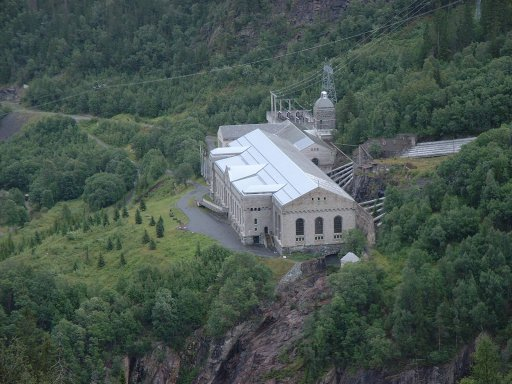
The Vemork hydroelectric plant in Norway, site of the heavy water production, and a part of the German nuclear program, sabotaged by Norwegians between 1942 and 1944

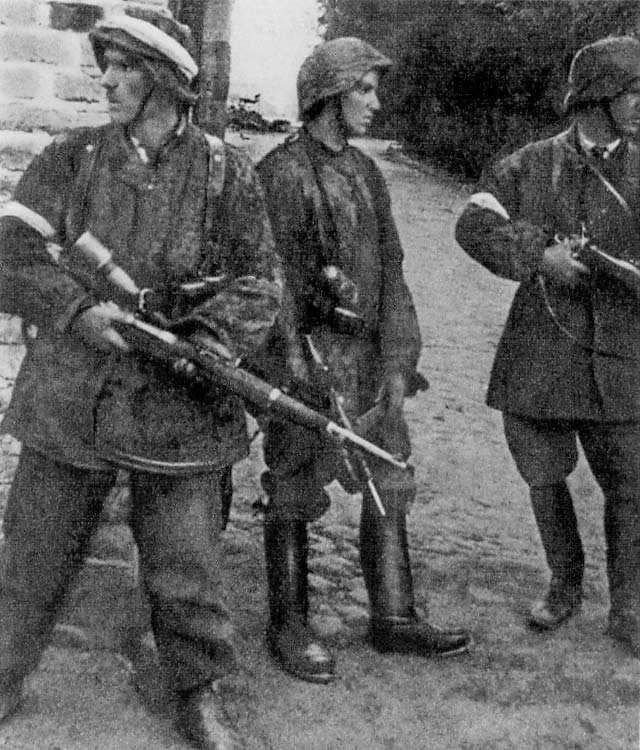
Polish resistance soldiers during 1944 Warsaw Uprising

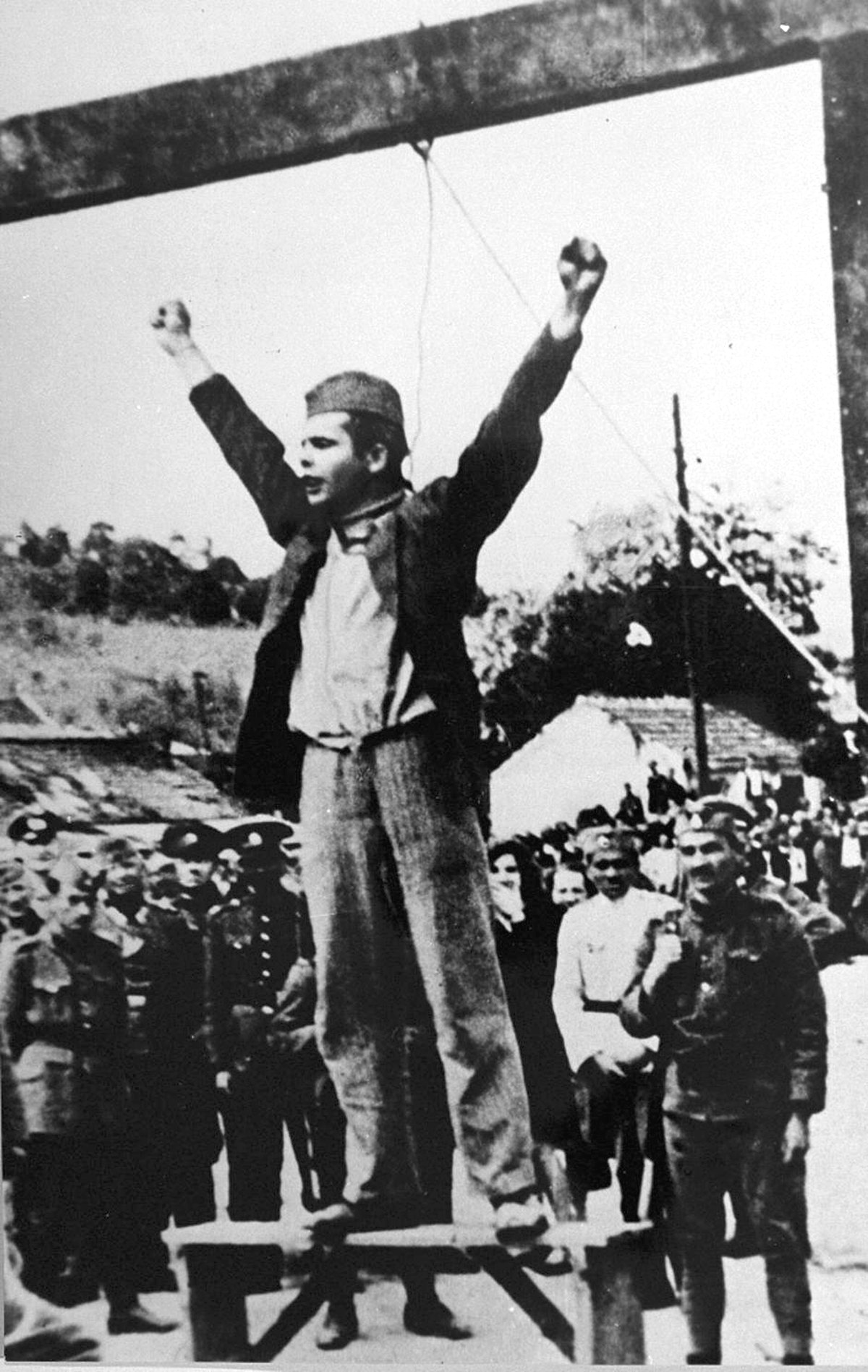
Yugoslav Partisan fighter Stjepan "Stevo" Filipović shouting "Smrt fašizmu sloboda narodu!" ("Death to fascism, freedom to the people!") (the Partisan slogan) seconds before plunging to his death

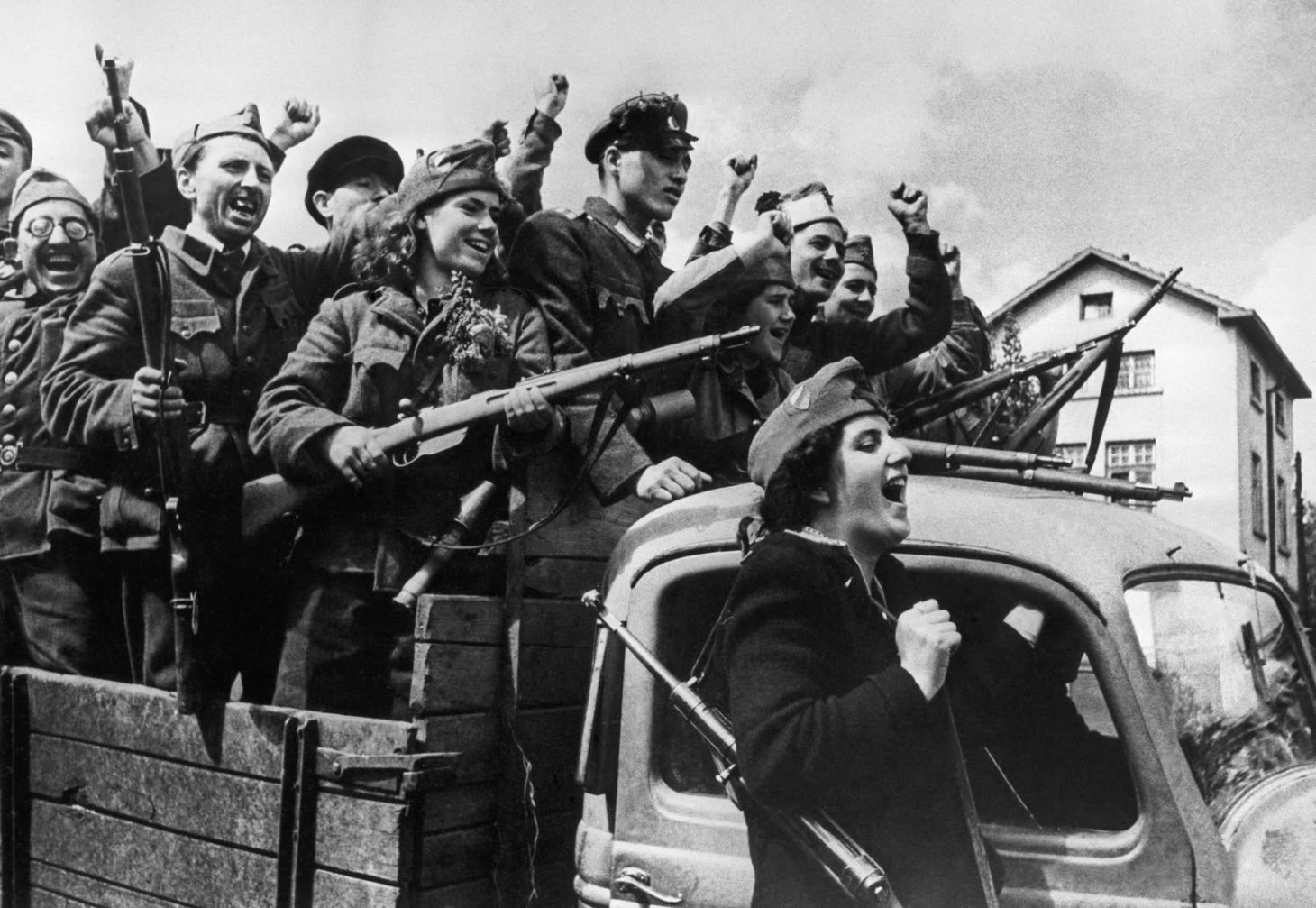
Bulgarian partisans entering Sofia on 9 September 1944

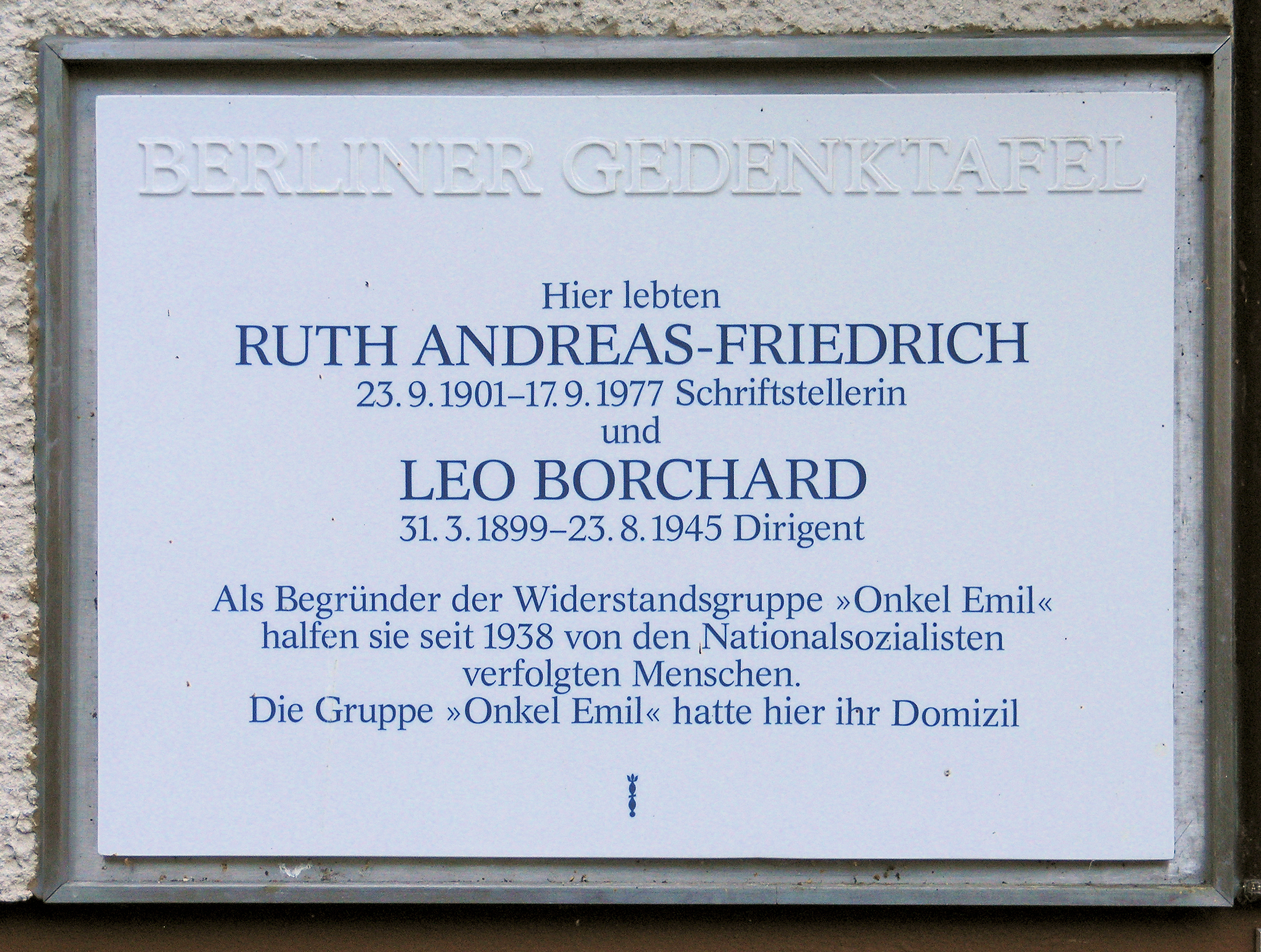
Berlin memorial plaque, Ruth Andreas-Friedrich (Onkel Emil)

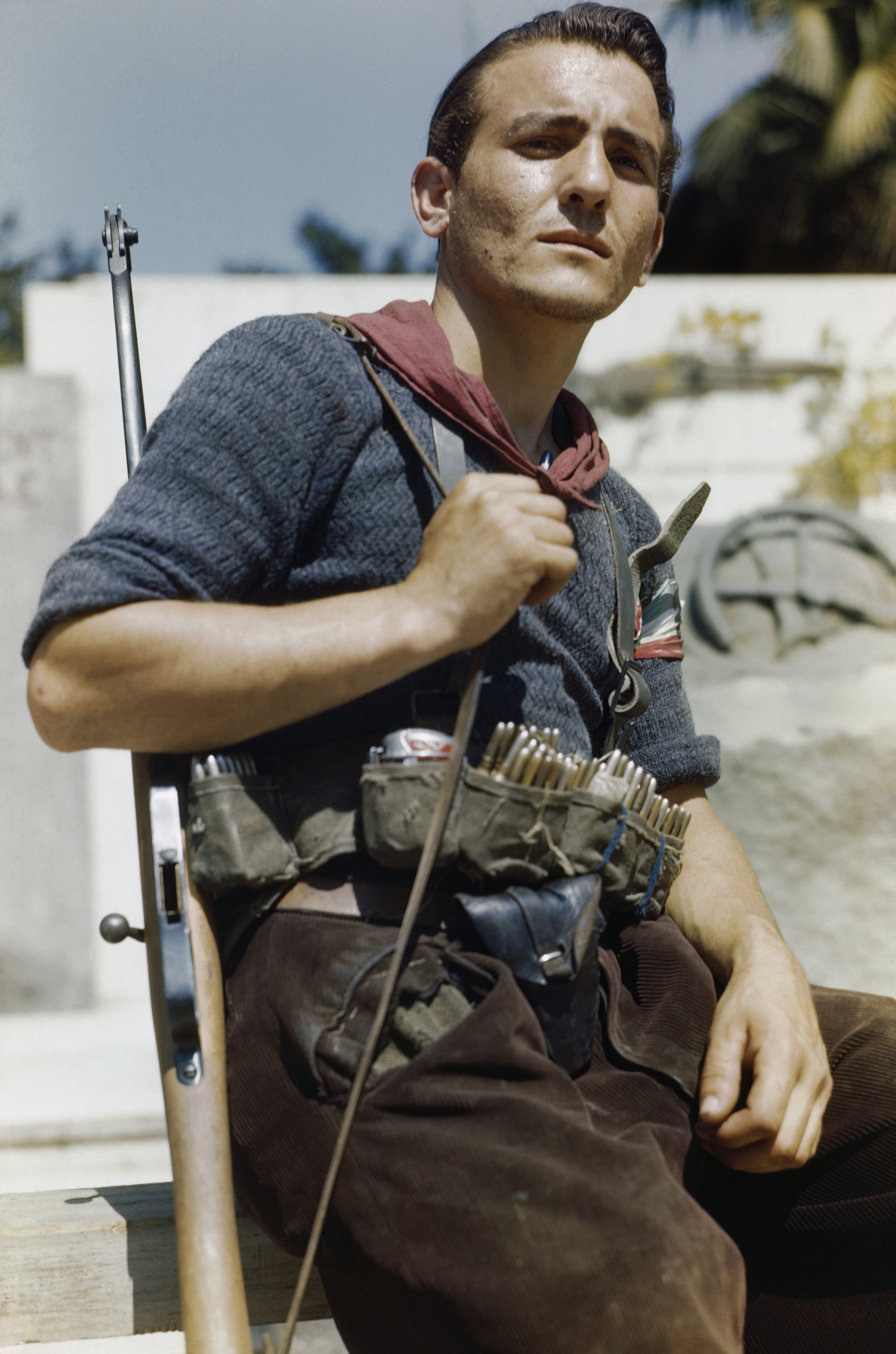
An Italian partisan in Florence on August 14, 1944

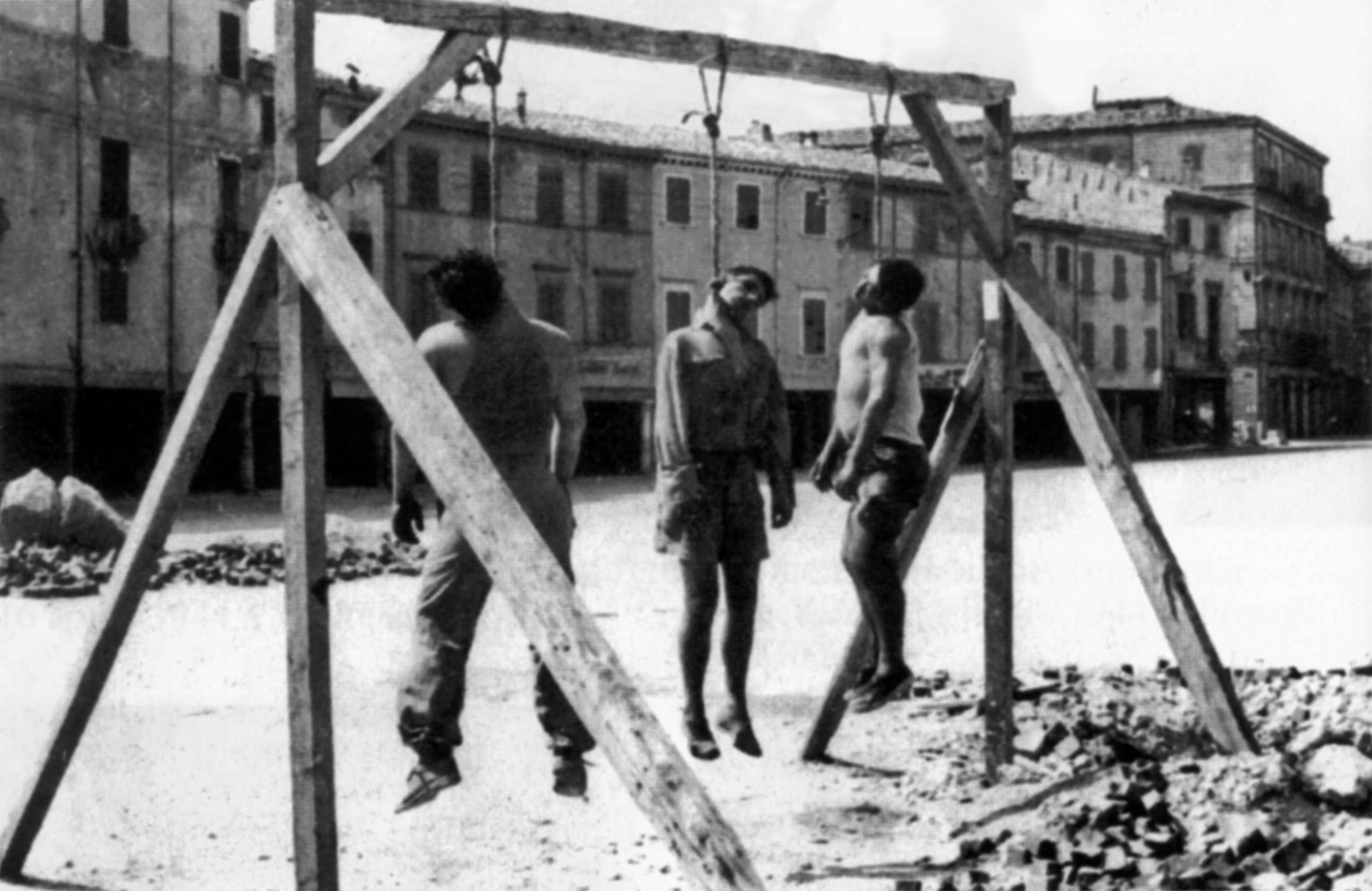
Three Italian partisans executed by public hanging in Rimini, August 1944

=== 1945 ===
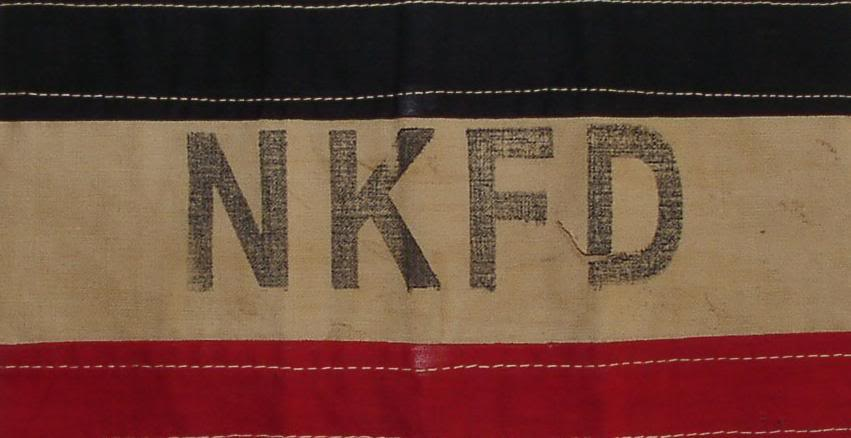
Variation of an armband worn by members of the National Committee for a Free Germany

Since January 1945, members of the anti-fascist National Committee for a Free Germany (NKFD) had been allowed to form companies which would participate as an auxiliary force of the Red Army in its military operations. The NKFD was formed in 1943 mostly of the German prisoners of war in the USSR which agreed to side the Red Army. While its leadership participated only in non-violent activities such as appeal to the German troops to surrender like during the Battle of Korsun–Cherkassy, in December 1943, its members of lower ranks began forming Combat Groups (or Combat Units, German: Kampfgruppen) were sent to the Wehrmacht rear areas where they combined propaganda with collecting intelligence, performing military reconnaissance, sabotage and combat against the Wehrmacht. Although until 1945 Kampfgruppen had been only small commandos, in 1945, it was allowed for NKFD to form companies which would be sent at the front. They pretended to be scattered Wehrmacht soldiers and attempted to enter behind the German lines, and if the latter was successful, they persuaded the troops besieged by the Red Army to surrender, and if the latter refused, they participated in combat and withdrew. There are clear evidences of the NKFD units participating in combat against the Wehrmacht in the Battle of Königsberg, siege of Breslau and in the Courland Pocket, as well as in the rather minor battles for Thorn and Graudenz and the siege of Danzig. As Otto Lasch wrote, "We could no longer think of a useful recipe for how our own soldiers should behave in such cases. The fight seemed to have become pointless if Germans were now fighting against Germans." There are several testimonies of the Germans who participated in the war that they saw members of the NKFD fighting alongside the Red Army during the Battle of Berlin, however, there is no documentary evidence, at least yet, to support these claims.

During the Vienna offensive of the Red Army between March and April 1945, the Austrian resistance groups in the army launched the Operation Radetzky led by major Carl Szokoll, a plot to surrender Vienna to the Red Army and therefore save it from destruction. Although the plot had failed, Szokoll survived, and the city only saw moderate fighting and the inner districts saw practically no fighting.

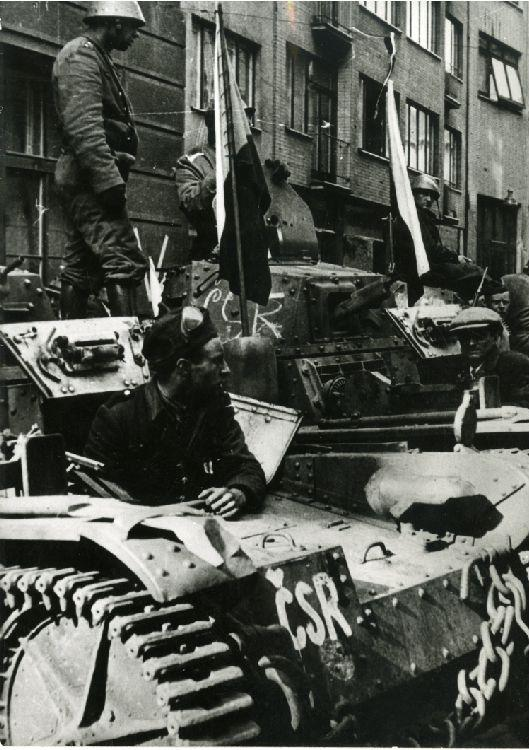
Captured AMR 35 tanks during the Prague uprising

During the last days of the war, on 5 May 1945, the Czech resistance launched the Prague uprising as the Allied forces advanced to Prague. The uprising was supported by the 1st Division of the Russian Liberation Army (ROA), a collaborationist unit formed mainly of ethnic Russian POWs in Germany. The ROA and the political movement behind it led by the Soviet defector general Andrey Vlasov was itself, as Martin Malia calls it, a "resistance" movement to Stalinism, but it achieved little but a de jure independent small Nazi-sponsored army headed by the Committee for the Liberation of the Peoples of Russia, a political organization which presented a democratic political program despite the Nazi control of the Vlasov movement. Initially, the Prague offensive of the Red Army which would liberate Czechoslovakia concurrently with the uprising, was set on 7 May, but as the uprising began the Red Army was ordered to advance the launch of its offensive to 6 May. The Western Allies did not participate in the liberation of Prague, and after the war the Stalinist regime was set up in Czechoslovakia.

== Resistance movements during World War II ==
- Albanian resistance movement
  - National Liberation Movement
  - Balli Kombëtar (anti-Italian and later anti-communist and anti-Yugoslav resistance movements)
  - Legality Movement
- Austrian resistance movement (e.g. O5)
  - Österreichische Freiheitsfront
  - Vierergruppen in Hamburg, Munich and Vienna
- Belarusian nationalist resistance movements:
  - Anti-Soviet resistance in Belarus (1944–1950s)
  - Belarusian People's Partisans, anti-Soviet and anti-Nazi
- Belgian Resistance
  - Armée Belge Reconstituée (ABR)
  - Armée secrète (AS)
  - Comet Line
  - Comité de Défense des Juifs (CDJ, Jewish resistance)
  - Front de l'Indépendance (FI)
  - Groupe G
  - Kempische Legioen (KL)
  - Légion Belge
  - Milices Patriotiques (MP-PM)
  - Mouvement National Belge (MNB)
  - Mouvement National Royaliste (MNR-NKB)
  - Organisation Militaire Belge de Résistance (OMBR)
  - Partisans Armés (PA)
  - Service D
  - Witte Brigade
- Borneo resistance movement
- British resistance movements
  - SIS Section D and Section VII (planned Resistance organisations)
  - Auxiliary Units (planned hidden commando force to operate during military anti-invasion campaign)
  - Resistance to German occupation of the Channel Islands
- Bulgarian resistance movements
  - Bulgarian resistance movement
  - Goryani (anti-communist resistance from 1944)
- Burman resistance movements:
  - Burma Independence Army (anti-British)
  - Anti-Fascist People's Freedom League
- Chechen resistance movement (anti-Soviet)
- Chinese resistance movements
  - Anti-Japanese Army For The Salvation Of The Country
  - Chinese People's National Salvation Army
  - Heilungkiang National Salvation Army
  - Jilin Self-Defence Army
  - Northeast Anti-Japanese National Salvation Army
  - Northeast Anti-Japanese United Army
  - Northeast People's Anti-Japanese Volunteer Army
  - Northeastern Loyal and Brave Army
  - Northeastern People's Revolutionary Army
  - Northeastern Volunteer Righteous & Brave Fighters
  - Hong Kong resistance movements
    - Gangjiu dadui (Hong Kong-Kowloon brigade)
    - East River Column (Dongjiang Guerrillas, Southern China and Hong Kong organisation)
  - Islamic resistance movement against Japan
    - Muslim Detachment (回民義勇隊 Huimin Zhidui)
    - Muslim corps
- Czech resistance movement
  - Jan Žižka partisan brigade
- Danish resistance movement
  - BoPa (Communist "Civil Partisans")
  - 5 Kolonne
- Dutch resistance movement
  - Binnenlandse Strijdkrachten
  - The Stijkel Group, a Dutch resistance movement, which mainly operated around the S-Gravenhage area.
  - Valkenburg resistance
- Estonian resistance movement
- Ethiopian resistance movement
- Pro-German resistance movement in Finland
- French resistance movement
  - Bureau Central de Renseignements et d'Action (BCRA)
  - Conseil National de la Résistance (CNR)
  - Francs-Tireurs et Partisans (FTP)
  - Free French Forces (FFL)
  - French Forces of the Interior (FFI)
  - Maquis
  - Pat O'Leary Line
- German anti-Nazi resistance movements
  - Communist underground groups
    - Bästlein-Jacob-Abshagen Group
    - Neu Beginnen
    - Saefkow-Jacob-Bästlein Organization
  - Black Orchestra
  - Non-violent resistance and dissidents
    - Confessing Church
    - European Union
    - Kreisau Circle
    - Solf Circle
    - Vierergruppen in Hamburg, Munich and Vienna
    - White Rose
  - Edelweiss Pirates
    - Ehrenfeld Group
  - Movement for a Free Germany formed by the emigres from Germany and German defectors to the Allied and Resistance forces
    - Anti-Fascist Committee for a Free Germany (AKFD), on the side of the Greek resistance
    - Committee "Free Germany" for the West (CALPO/KFDW), on the side of the French resistance
    - National Committee for a Free Germany (NKFD) and its Combat Units, participated in military operations of the Red Army and attempted to launch guerilla warfare in Germany
  - Red Orchestra
- German pro-Nazi resistance in Allied-occupied areas
  - Volkssturm – a German resistance group and militia created by the NSDAP near the end of World War II
  - Werwolf – Nazi German resistance movement against the Allied occupation
- Greek Resistance
  - List of Greek Resistance organizations
  - Cretan resistance
  - National Liberation Front (EAM) and the Greek People's Liberation Army (ELAS), EAM's guerrilla forces
  - National Republican Greek League (EDES)
  - National and Social Liberation (EKKA)
- Hungarian resistance movement, anti-fascist anti-Axis movement against the Horthy regime and the Government of National Unity
  - 10 Communist partisan detachments sent from the Soviet Union
  - Pro-Soviet Béla Miklós government of Hungary
  - Volunteer Regiment of Buda of the Red Army
- Indian resistance movements:
  - Quit India Movement
  - Azad Hind
    - Indian National Army, is an armed force who fought for India's Independence with Japan fighting against Allied forces (mainly against Britain) in Southeast Asia and along India's easternmost borderlands
- Indonesian resistance movements
- Italian resistance movement
  - Arditi del Popolo
  - Assisi Network
  - Brigate Fiamme Verdi
  - Comitato di Liberazione Nazionale
  - Concentrazione Antifascista Italiana
  - DELASEM
  - Democrazia Cristiana
  - Four days of Naples
  - Giustizia e Libertà
  - Italian Civil War
  - Italian Co-Belligerent Army, Navy, and Air Force
  - Italian Communist Party (PCI)
  - Italian partisan republics
  - Italian Socialist Party (PSI)
  - Labour Democratic Party (PDL)
  - Movimento Comunista d'Italia
  - National Liberation Committee for Northern Italy
  - Partito d'Azione
  - Scintilla
- Italian resistance against the Allies
  - Black Brigades
  - Italian guerrilla war in Ethiopia
- Japanese anti-imperial resistance
  - Dissent in the Armed Forces of the Empire of Japan
  - Japanese in the Chinese resistance to the Empire of Japan
    - Japanese Communist Party
    - Japanese People's Emancipation League
    - Japanese People's Anti-war Alliance
    - League to Raise the Political Consciousness of Japanese Troops
- Japanese pro-imperial resistance
  - Japanese holdout
  - Volunteer Fighting Corps
- Jewish resistance in German-occupied Europe (transnational)
  - Resistance movement in Auschwitz
- Korean resistance movement
  - Provisional Government of the Republic of Korea
    - Korean Liberation Army
  - Korean Volunteer Army
  - Korean Volunteer Corps
- Lithuanian, Latvian and Estonian anti-Soviet resistance movements ("Forest Brothers")
- Latvian resistance movement
- Libyan resistance movement
- Lithuanian resistance during World War II
  - Lithuanian Activist Front
  - Lithuanian Liberty Army
- Luxembourgish resistance during World War II
- Malayan resistance movement
  - Askar Melayu Setia (Loyal Malay Soldier/Army)
  - Wataniah
  - Pasukan Gerlia Kinabalu (Kinabalu Guerilla Force)
  - Force 136 Malay Warrior
- Moldovan resistance during World War II
- Norwegian resistance movement
  - Milorg
  - Nortraship
  - Norwegian Independent Company 1 (Kompani Linge)
  - Osvald Group
  - XU
- Philippine resistance movement
  - Allied guerrillas (composed of unsurrendered USAFFE troops including Filipino civilians).
  - Moro Muslim resistance movement
  - Hukbalahap
- Polish resistance movement
  - Polish Underground State, led by the Polish government in exile
    - Polish Armed Forces in the West
    - Armia Krajowa (Home Army—mainstream: Authoritarian/Western Democracy)
    - Gwardia Ludowa WRN (The People's Guard Freedom Equality Independence—mainstream Polish Socialist Party's underground, progressive, anti—Nazi and anti—Soviet)
    - Narodowe Siły Zbrojne (National Armed Forces – Anti-Nazi, Anti-Communist)
    - Cursed soldiers (Anti-Communist)
  - Leśni (various "forest People")
  - Bataliony Chłopskie (Peasant Battalions — mainstream, apolitical, stress on private property)
  - Polish Committee of National Liberation, supported by the USSR
    - Polish Workers' Party and Union of Polish Patriots
    - Armia Ludowa (People's Army)
    - Gwardia Ludowa (People's Guard)
    - Polish Armed Forces in the East
  - Jewish organizations
    - Żydowska Organizacja Bojowa (ŻOB, Jewish Fighting Organisation in Poland)
    - Żydowski Związek Walki (ŻZW, Jewish Fighting Union in Poland)
- Romanian anti-fascist anti-Axis resistance and political opposition
  - Tudor Vladimirescu Division and Horea, Cloșca și Crișan Division of the Red Army
- The "Republic of Rossony" formed by a group of Soviet partisans, described as "neither for the Soviets nor the Germans"
- The so-called "Russian Liberation Movement" attempted to create an independent (either allied with Germany or opposing both sides) Russian anti-Communist force by means of collaboration with the Nazis
  - Committee for the Liberation of the Peoples of Russia and the Russian Liberation Army within the Wehrmacht, formally released from German command in January 1945, switched sides in May 1945
  - GULAG Operation
  - Russian People's Liberation Army, pro-Nazi militia of the Lokot Autonomy, later absorbed as a part of the Waffen-SS, reformed as an anti-Soviet partisan movement after the war
- Singaporean resistance movement
  - Dalforce
  - Force 136
- Slovak resistance movement
  - Slovak National Uprising
- Soviet partisan movement
  - Belarusian Soviet partisans
  - Estonian Soviet partisans
  - Latvian Soviet partisans
  - Moldovan Soviet partisans
  - Soviet partisans in Finland
  - Soviet partisans in Poland
  - Young Guard (Soviet resistance)
- Thai resistance movement
- Tigrayan resistance movement (anti-Ethiopian)
- Ukrainian resistance movements:
  - Ukrainian Insurgent Army (anti-German, anti-Soviet and anti-Polish resistance movement)
  - Ukrainian People's Revolutionary Army (anti-German, anti-Soviet and anti-Polish resistance movement)
  - Self-defense Kushch Units – self-defense units formed to protect Ukrainian villages in Volhynia and Galicia.
- Ustaše – Croatian nationalist and fascist resistance movement against the Kingdom of Yugoslavia/Chetniks and Yugoslav communists
  - Crusaders – Croatian Ustaše guerrilla movement fighting against Yugoslav communist forces
- Viet Minh (Vietnamese resistance organization that fought Vichy France and the Japanese, and later against the French attempt to re-occupy Vietnam)
- Yugoslav resistance movement
  - Yugoslav Partisans (People's Liberation Army — pro-Soviet Yugoslav communist-led anti-fascist anti-Axis, and anti-Yugoslav royalist anti-Chetniks resistance movement)
    - Croatian Partisans
    - Macedonian Partisans
    - Serbian Partisans
    - Slovene Partisans
  - Chetniks (Yugoslav Army in the Homeland — Yugoslav royalist, anti-Axis, anti-Nazi German, anti-Croatian Ustaše, anti-Albanian and anti-Yugoslav Communist-led Partisans resistance movement)
    - Blue Guard – Slovenian Chetniks
  - TIGR (Slovene and Croat anti-Italian resistance movement, active between 1927 and 1941. Gradually absorbed into the Yugoslav Partisans throughout WWII.)

== Notable individuals ==
- Giorgio Amendola
- Mordechaj Anielewicz
- Dawid Apfelbaum
- Yitzhak Arad
- Stanisław Aronson
- Walter Audisio
- Ma Benzhai (zh:馬本齋)
- Georges Bidault
- Ana Maria Bidegaray
- Tuvia Bielski
- Mustapha bin Harun
- Alexander Bogen
- Lee Bong-chang
- Yun Bong-gil
- Dietrich Bonhoeffer
- Tadeusz Bor-Komorowski
- Petr Braiko
- Pierre Brossolette
- Masha Bruskina
- Taras Bulba-Borovets
- Danielle Casanova
- Alexander Chekalin
- Velimir Đurić
- Marek Edelman
- Paul Eluard
- Oleksiy Fedorov
- Romain Gary
- Charles De Gaulle
- Henri Giraud
- Manolis Glezos
- Marianne Golz
- Stefan Grot-Rowecki
- Jens Christian Hauge
- Henri Honoré d'Estienne d'Orves
- Enver Hoxha
- Khasan Israilov
- Jan Karski
- Vassili Kononov
- Oleg Koshevoy
- Zoya Kosmodemyanskaya
- Sava Kovačević
- Sydir Kovpak
- Kim Ku
- Nikolai Kuznetsov
- Albert Kwok
- Martin Linge
- Hans Litten
- Luigi Longo
- Zivia Lubetkin
- Juozas Lukša
- Pavel Luspekayev
- Ramon Magsaysay
- Max Manus
- Pyotr Masherov
- Ho Chi Minh
- Missak Manouchian
- Jean Moulin
- Omar Mukhtar
- Sanzo Nosaka
- D'Arcy Osborne, 12th Duke of Leeds
- Otomars Oškalns
- Ferruccio Parri
- Alexander Pechersky
- Motiejus Pečiulionis (lt)
- Salipada Pendatun
- Chin Peng
- Sandro Pertini
- Gumbay Piang
- Abbé Pierre
- Witold Pilecki
- Christian Pineau
- Panteleimon Ponomarenko
- Koča Popović
- Zinaida Portnova
- Lepa Radić
- Adolfas Ramanauskas
- Erik Hazelhoff Roelfzema
- Semyon Rudniev
- Alexander Saburov
- Hannie Schaft
- Pierre Schunck
- Sophie Scholl
- Baron Jean de Selys Longchamps
- Roman Shukhevych
- Henk Sneevliet
- Gunnar Sønsteby
- Arturs Sproģis
- Ilya Starinov
- Claus von Stauffenberg
- Imants Sudmalis
- Luis Taruc
- Josip Broz Tito
- Palmiro Togliatti
- Aris Velouchiotis
- Pyotr Vershigora
- Nancy Wake
- Kaji Wataru
- Gijs van Hall
- Walraven van Hall
- Jonas Žemaitis
- Napoleon Zervas
- Simcha Zorin
- Yitzhak Zuckerman

== Documentaries ==
- Confusion was their business from the BBC series Secrets of World War II is a documentary about the SOE (Special Operations Executive) and its operations.
- The Real Heroes of Telemark is a book and documentary by survival expert Ray Mears about the Norwegian sabotage of the German nuclear program (Norwegian heavy water sabotage)
- Making Choices: The Dutch Resistance during World War II (2005) This award-winning, hour-long documentary tells the stories of four participants in the Dutch Resistance and the miracles that saved them from certain death at the hands of the Nazis.

== Dramatisations ==
- 'Allo 'Allo! (1982–1992) a situation comedy about the French resistance movement (a parody of Secret Army)
- L’Armée des ombres (1969) internal and external battles of the French resistance. Directed by Jean-Pierre Melville
- Battle of Neretva (film) (1969) is a movie depicting events that took place during the Fourth anti-Partisan Offensive (Fall Weiss), also known as The Battle for the Wounded
- Black Book (film) (2006) depicts double and triple crosses amongst the Dutch Resistance
- Bonhoeffer (2004 premier at the Acacia Theatre) is a play about Dietrich Bonhoeffer, a pastor in the Confessing Church executed for his participation in the German resistance.
- Boško Buha (1978) tells the tale of a boy who conned his way into partisan ranks aged 15 and became legendary for his talent of destroying enemy bunkers
- Charlotte Gray (2001) – thought to be based on Nancy Wake
- Chetniks! The Fighting Guerrillas (1943) - war film about Serbian chetniks leader Draza Mihailovic and his antinazi fight in Yugoslavia, made by Twentieth Century Fox.
- Come and See (1985) is a Soviet made film about partisans in Belarus, as well as war crimes committed by the war's various factions.
- Defiance (2008) tells the story of the Bielski partisans, a group of Jewish resistance fighters operating in Belorussia.
- Flame & Citron (2008) is a movie based on two Danish resistance fighters who were in the Holger Danske (resistance group).
- The Four Days of Naples (1962) is a movie based on the popular uprising against the German forces occupying the Italian city of Naples.
- A Generation (1955) (Polish) two young men involved in resistance by GL
- The Heroes of Telemark (1965) is very loosely based on the Norwegian sabotage of the German nuclear program (the later Real Heroes of Telemark is more accurate)
- Het meisje met het rode haar (1982) (Dutch) is about Dutch resistance fighter Hannie Schaft
- Kanał (1956) (Polish) first film ever to depict Warsaw Uprising
- The Longest Day (1962) features scenes of the resistance operations during Operation Overlord
- Massacre in Rome (1973) is based on a true story about Nazi retaliation after a resistance attack in Rome
- My Opposition: the Diaries of Friedrich Kellner (2007) is a Canadian film about Justice Inspector Friedrich Kellner of Laubach who challenged the Nazis before and during the war
- Resistance (2003): a film based on a 1995 book of the same title by Anita Shreve. The plot revolves around a downed American pilot who is sheltered by the Belgian resistance.
- Secret Army (1977) a television series about the Belgian resistance movement, based on real events
- Sea Of Blood (1971) a North Korean opera depicting Anti-Japanese resistance
- Soldaat van Oranje (1977) (Dutch) is about some Dutch students who enter the resistance in cooperation with England
- Sophie Scholl – Die letzten Tage (2005) is about the last days in the life of Sophie Scholl
- Stärker als die Nacht (1954) (East German) follows the story of a group of German Communist resistance fighters
- The Battle of Sutjeska (1973) is a movie based on the events that took place during the Fifth anti-Partisan Offensive (Fall Schwartz)
- Winter in Wartime (film), 2008 adaptation of Jan Terlouw's 1972 novel, about a Dutch youth whose favors for members of the Dutch Resistance during the last winter of World War II have a devastating impact on his family
- The Resistance Banker Bankier van het verzet (film), is a 2018 Dutch World-War-II-period drama film directed by Joram Lürsen. The film is based on the life of banker Walraven van Hall, who financed the Dutch resistance during the Second World War.

== See also ==
- Anti-partisan operations in World War II
- Anti-Soviet partisans

== Notes ==
a Sources vary with regard to what was the largest resistance movement during World War II. The confusion often stems from the fact that as war progressed, some resistance movements grew larger – and other diminished. In particular, Polish and Soviet territories were mostly freed from Nazi German control in the years 1944–1945, eliminating the need for their respective (anti-Nazi) partisan forces (in Poland, cursed soldiers continued to fight against the Soviets). Fighting in Yugoslavia, however, with Yugoslavian partisans fighting German units, continued till the end of the war. The numbers for each of those three movements can be roughly estimated as approaching 100,000 in 1941, and 200,000 in 1942, with Polish and Soviet partisan numbers peaking around 1944 at 350,000-400,000, and Yugoslavian, growing till the very end till they reached the 800,000.

Several sources note that Polish Armia Krajowa was the largest resistance movement in Nazi-occupied Europe. For example, Norman Davies wrote "Armia Krajowa (Home Army), the AK, which could fairly claim to be the largest of European resistance"; Gregor Dallas wrote "Home Army (Armia Krajowa or AK) in late 1943 numbered around 400,000, making it the largest resistance organization in Europe"; Mark Wyman wrote "Armia Krajowa was considered the largest underground resistance unit in wartime Europe". Certainly, Polish resistance was the largest resistance till German invasion of Yugoslavia and invasion of the Soviet Union in 1941.

After that point, the numbers of Soviet partisans and Yugoslav partisans began growing rapidly. The numbers of Soviet partisans quickly caught up and were very similar to that of the Polish resistance (a graph is also available here).

The numbers of Tito's Yugoslav partisans were roughly similar to those of the Polish and Soviet partisans in the first years of the war (1941–1942), but grew rapidly in the latter years, outnumbering the Polish and Soviet partisans by 2:1 or more (estimates give Yugoslavian forces about 800,000 in 1945, to Polish and Soviet forces of 400,000 in 1944). Some authors also call it the largest resistance movement in Nazi-occupied Europe, for example, Kathleen Malley-Morrison wrote: "The Yugoslav partisan guerrilla campaign, which developed into the largest resistance army in occupied Western and Central Europe...".

The numbers of French resistance were smaller, around 10,000 in 1942, and swelling to 200,000 by 1944.
