= Resistance movement =

Organized effort to withstand a government or an occupying power

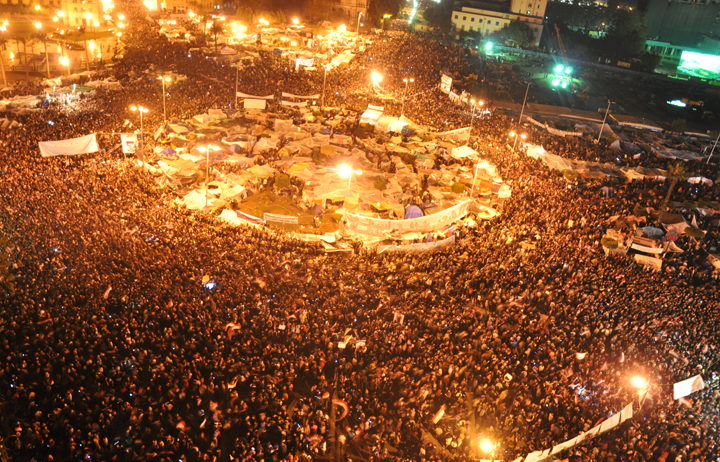
Mass demonstrations in Tahrir Square during the 2011 Egyptian revolution

A resistance movement is an organized effort by a group of people to oppose or challenge an established authority, such as a government or an occupying power. Such movements may seek to change, reform, or overthrow existing power structures and can employ a range of methods, including nonviolent resistance (such as civil disobedience) and violent or armed struggle. In practice, resistance movements often combine multiple strategies and may operate through different organizations or across distinct phases or geographical areas.

== Etymology and usage ==
The Oxford English Dictionary generally defines "resistance" as the action of "resisting, opposing, or withstanding someone or something." In a political sense, it records the term as referring to "organized (in later use usually covert) opposition to an invading, occupying, or ruling power." The capitalized form "the Resistance" became widespread during World War II, when it was adopted by multiple movements opposing Axis-occupation, especially the French Resistance formed in June 1940 against German occupying forces.

In contemporary scholarship, resistance is often treated as a broad and contested concept. Mona Lilja argues that resistance can be understood as an "umbrella concept" encompassing everyday, serial and organized forms of resistance, as well as the connection between them.

== Definition and classification ==
Resistance movements have appeared in a wide range of political contexts, including opposition to foreign occupation, colonial rule, authoritarian governments, and other established authorities. They may operate openly or clandestinely, and can involve formal organizations, loose networks, underground groups, or broader popular mobilizations.

Scholars have described both armed and unarmed resistance as forms of "collective action" carried out by organized opposition movements, often outside of conventional political channels. Such movements may represent marginalized, oppressed, or politically excluded groups and are commonly associated with contentious or disruptive politics. Further, resistance movements are often analyzed as forms of asymmetric conflict, in which weaker actors confront more powerful states, occupying powers, or ruling authorities through strategies intended to raise the costs imposed on the dominant actor. Keith D. Dickson argues that resistance is often shaped by "variances, dissimilarities, or inequalities between adversaries," especially when one actor holds significantly more power than the other.

Their methods vary widely. Some movements rely on nonviolent resistance, including civil disobedience, strikes, boycotts, demonstrations, and other forms of non-cooperation. Others engage in armed resistance, including guerrilla warfare, sabotage, or insurgency. In practice, the boundary between armed and unarmed resistance is often blurry and fluid, as resistance movements may combine violent and nonviolent methods, or shift between them over time.

The classification of resistance movements is often contested. States may describe violent resistance movements as terrorists or insurgents, while supporters may describe the same actors as liberation movements or freedom fighters. Therefore, terminology may vary depending on political context, legal status and perspective.

== Forms of resistance ==
=== Nonviolent resistance ===
Nonviolent resistance refers to collective methods of opposition that challenge authority without the use of physical violence. It has been defined as "organized popular resistance to government authority" that "eschews the use of weapons of modern warfare." Scholars have commonly adopted Gene Sharp's categorization of nonviolent action into three broad categories: protest and persuasion, non-cooperation, and intervention. These methods can include civil disobedience, public persuasion, demonstrations, marches, strikes, boycotts, hunger strikes, and other forms of collective action. In resistance movements, nonviolent methods may be used independently or alongside other strategies, including armed resistance. Historical examples of nonviolent resistance include the U.S. Civil Rights Movement, the Salt March, and parts of the Arab Spring.

=== Violent resistance ===
Violent resistance refers to methods of opposition that involve the use or threat of physical force against a government, occupying power, or other established authority. In scholarship, violence is often distinguished from nonviolent action by infliction of "physical damage to persons or property." Methods of violent resistance can include armed struggle, guerrilla warfare, sabotage, insurgency, assassination, and attacks on military, police, or state infrastructure. The classification of violent resistance remains contested, especially in the context of armed groups within national liberation movements, such as in Algeria, Palestine or Ireland. Supporters may describe armed groups as liberation movements or freedom fighters, while states and opponents may classify the same groups as insurgents, rebels, militants, or terrorists. Historical examples of violent resistance include partisan warfare during WWII and various guerrilla movements in contexts of colonial rule, such as the National Liberation Front during the Algerian War of Independence.

=== Labor-based resistance ===
Labor-based resistance refers to forms of opposition that are organized through workplaces, labor relations, or workers' collective action. Resistance tactics may be directed against employers, states, occupying powers, or wider political and economic systems. It can take collective forms, such as strikes, slowdowns, work-to-rule campaigns, workplace occupations, boycotts, as well as more individualized or informal forms, including absenteeism, work avoidance, sabotage, and other forms of non-cooperation. Some labor-based tactics may also overlap with forms of economic resistance, including boycotts and tax refusal. James C. Scott's concept of "everyday forms of resistance" has been used to describe covert and informal practices, including "foot-dragging, dissimulations, false compliance, feigned ignorance, desertion [...], sabotage," which he describes as "the ordinary means of class struggle."

Within resistance movements, labor-based tactics can disrupt production and administration within a state. Because states, colonial economies, and imperial modes of production often depend on the organization and control of labor, workers may be able to exercise political leverage by withdrawing or disrupting their labor. Labor-based resistance can therefore function both as an economic tactic and as a political strategy of resistance movements.

==== Historical examples of Labor-based Resistance ====
Labor-based resistance has appeared in anti-colonial struggles as well as anti-apartheid organizing.

===== Palestine =====
In the Palestinian context, general strikes have formed part of broader resistance strategies in several historical periods. The 1936 general strike marked the opening phase of the 1936-1939 Arab revolt against British rule and Zionist settlement, while Land Day in 1976 involved a general strike against land confiscation. Scholars have described strikes, boycotts, tax refusal, and work stoppages during the First Intifada as a broader strategy of economic resistance against Israeli occupation. Dana describes this strategy as "economic warfare," involving commercial strikes, boycotts of Israeli goods, withholding tax payments, and refusal to work in the Israeli marketplace and settlements. One well-known example was the Beit Sahour tax strike of 1989, in which residents of Beit Sahour refused to pay taxes to the Israeli Civil Administration. Coordinated work stoppages have also been discussed in relation to the Palestinian general strike of May 2021, which briefly demonstrated the disruptive potential of Palestinian labor across Israel and the occupied territories.

===== South Africa =====
In South Africa, labor-based resistance formed an important part of anti-apartheid organizing. The apartheid labor system relied on a racially divided workforce and restricted African workers' rights to organize, bargain collectively and strike, while utilizing mechanisms such as migrant labor, pass laws, and state-controlled workplace committees to regulate black labor and outlaw strike action. Black workers nevertheless used strikes, stoppages, union organizing, and stay-aways to challenge both employers and the Apartheid state.

The 1973 Durban strikes in which more than 60,000 workers participated, marked an important turning point in the revival of independent African trade unionism as it demonstrated how "vulnerable [...] South African economy was to resistance by black workers." During the 1976 uprisings and subsequent urban unrest, mass strikes and stay-aways involved more than 500,000 Africans across South Africa. Scholars describe the following Wiehahn and Riekert commissions as part of the apartheid state's "strategy aimed at restoring political and economic stability" by incorporating sections of the black workforce into more effective mechanisms of labor control, effectively resulting in more repression for black workers. In the following years, black labor movements became increasingly central to anti-Apartheid resistance and continued to place pressure on employers through continuous strikes, consumer boycotts, and mass stay-aways, forcing major concessions by employers. Hudson-Allison argues that the Apartheid economy depended on a cooperative black labor force and that organized black labor helped bring Apartheid structures "to its knees" during the 1970s and 1980s. This was reflected in the formation of the Congress of South African Trade Unions (COSATU), unifying around 500,000 workers and becoming an important force in the struggle against Apartheid.

== Controversy regarding definition ==
On the lawfulness of armed resistance movements in international law, there has been a dispute between states since at least 1899, when the first major codification of the laws of war in the form of a series of international treaties took place. In the Preamble to the 1899 Hague Convention II on Land War, the Martens Clause was introduced as a compromise wording for the dispute between the Great Powers who considered francs-tireurs to be unlawful combatants subject to execution on capture and smaller states who maintained that they should be considered lawful combatants.

More recently the 1977 Protocol Additional to the Geneva Conventions of 12 August 1949, and relating to the Protection of Victims of International Armed Conflicts, referred in Article 1. Paragraph 4 to armed conflicts "... in which peoples are fighting against colonial domination and alien occupation and against racist regimes..." This phraseology, according USA that refused to ratify the Protocol, contains multiple ambiguities that cloud the issue of who is or is not a legitimate combatant: ultimately, in US Government opinion the distinction is just a political judgment.

Some definitions of resistance movement have proved controversial. Hence depending on the perspective of a state's government, a resistance movement may or may not be labelled a terrorist group based on whether the members of a resistance movement are considered lawful or unlawful combatants and whether they are recognized as having a right to resist occupation.

According to Joint Publication 1-02, the United States Department of Defense defines a resistance movement as "an organized effort by some portion of the civil population of a country to resist the legally established government or an occupying power and to disrupt civil order and stability". In strict military terminology, a resistance movement is simply that; it seeks to resist (change) the policies of a government or occupying power. This may be accomplished through violent or non-violent means. In this view, a resistance movement is specifically limited to changing the nature of current power, not to overthrow it; and the correct military term for removing or overthrowing a government is an insurgency. However, in reality a number of resistance movements have aimed to displace a particular ruler, especially if that ruler has gained or retained power illegally.

== Examples of resistance movements ==
The following examples are of groups that have been considered or would identify themselves as groups. These are mostly, but not exclusively, of armed resistance movements. For movements and phases of activity involving non-violent methods, see civil resistance and nonviolent resistance.

=== Pre–20th century ===
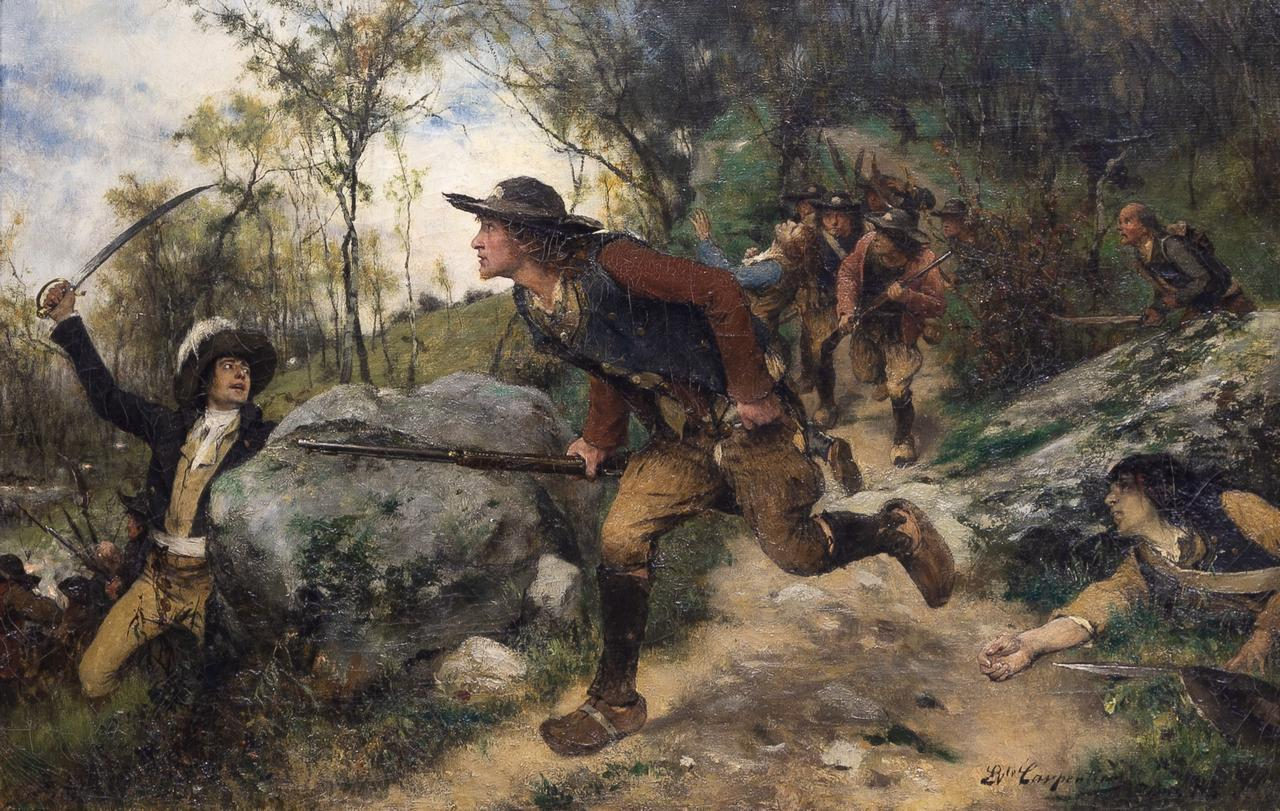
The Vendeans revolted against the revolutionary government in France in 1793.

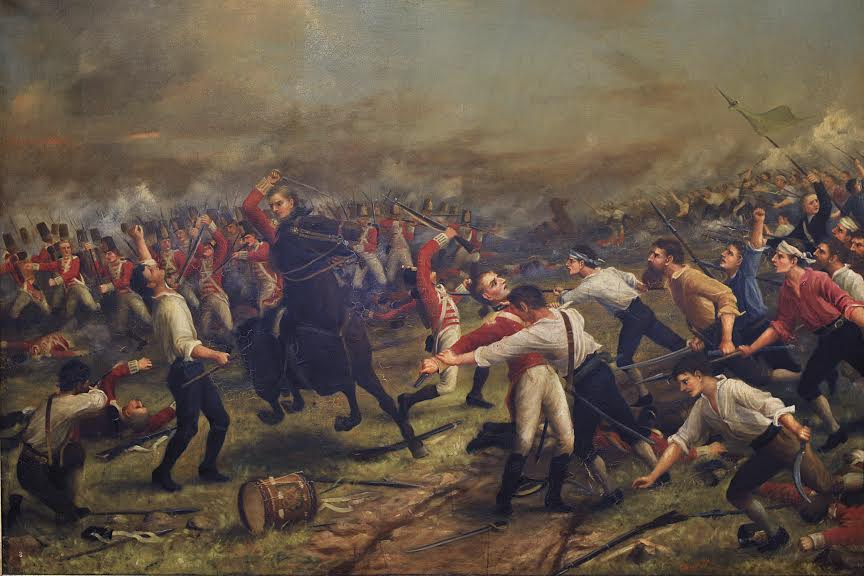
Irish Rebellion of 1798

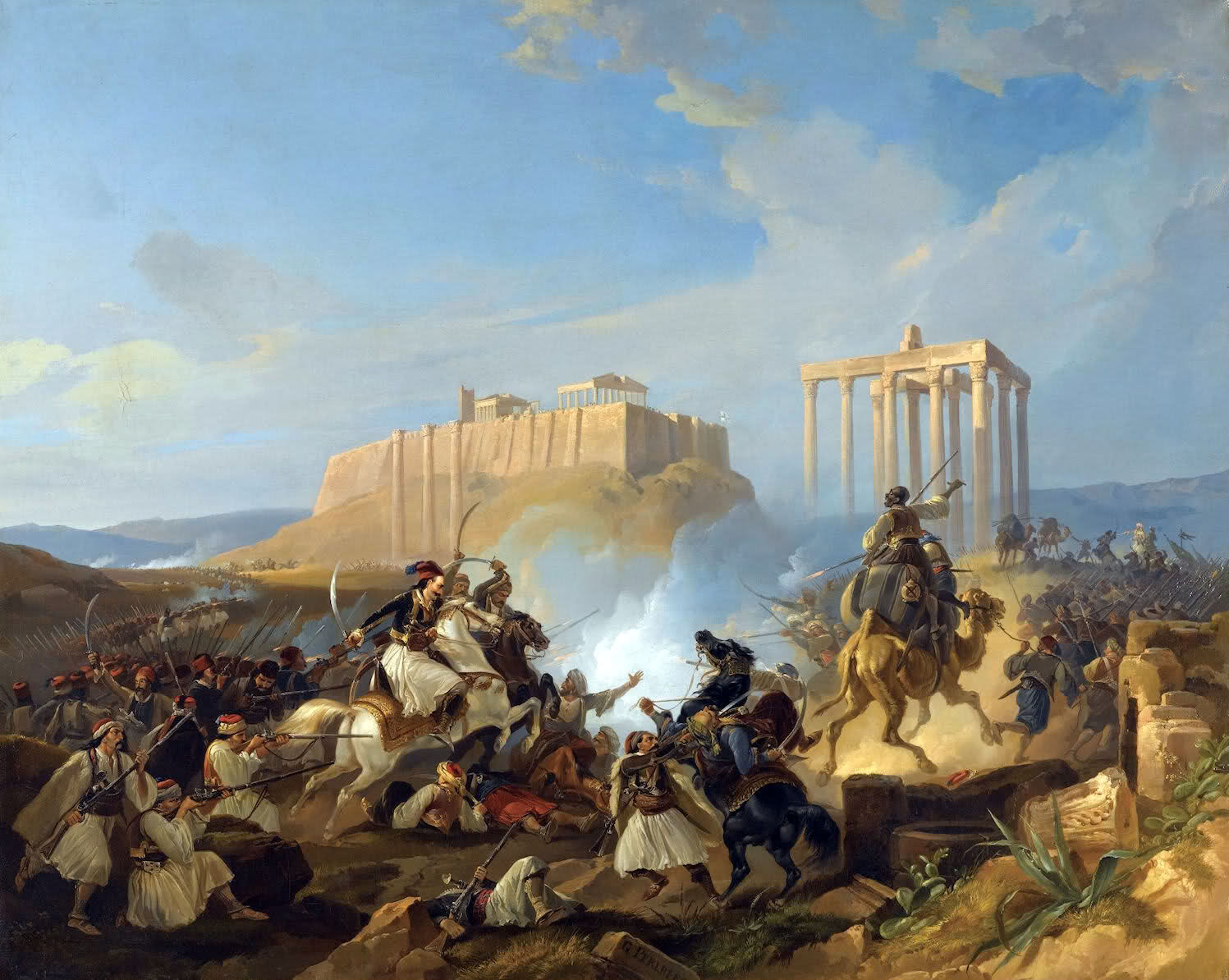
Greek War of Independence, (1821–29), rebellion of Greeks within the Ottoman Empire, a struggle which resulted in the establishment of an independent Greece

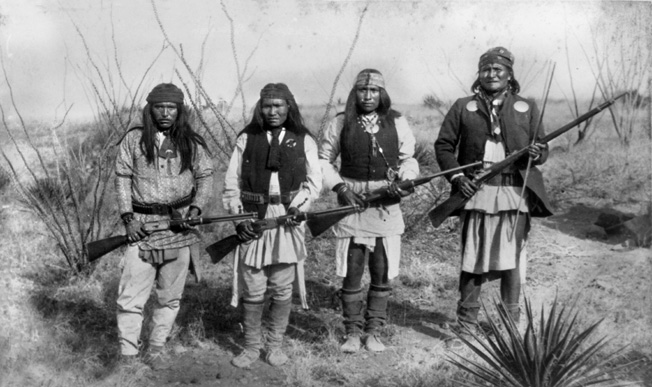
Geronimo (right) alongside his fellow Apache warriors in 1886

- The Maccabees were first-century BC Jewish rebel warriors who fought against the occupying Seleucid Empire in Judea, as described in the deuterocanonical Books of the Maccabees.
- The Sicarii (66-73) were a first-century Jewish movement opposing Roman occupation of the Jewish Promised Land.
- The Yellow Turbans (184–205) were peasant rebels against the Eastern Han dynasty, led by Zhang Jue, was crushed by the lack of co-ordination with other Yellow Turban groups as well as destabilization.
- The Abbasid Revolution (747-750) overthrow of the Umayyad dynasty under Abu Muslim, which was caused by discrimination against non-Arab Muslims and government corruption.
- The Mamluks were Turkic slaves who overthrew the Ayyubid dynasty (1341).
- In opposition to British rule in Ireland and the subsequent Plantations of Ireland, the native Gaelic population, at times with and against the Hiberno-Normans lords, launched the Bruce campaign in Ireland (1315-1318), the Desmond Rebellions (1569–1573 & 1579–1583), the Nine Years' War, also known as Tyrone's Rebellion, (1593-1603), the Irish Rebellion of 1641 & the subsequent Irish Confederate Wars (1641-1653), the Williamite War in Ireland (1688–1691), the Irish Rebellion of 1798, also known as the United Irishmen Rebellion, and the Tithe War (1831-1836).
- The Jacobite risings (1689-1746) were a series of rebellions, uprisings, and wars to reinstate the Stuart dynasty.
- The American Continental forces of the American Revolutionary War (1765–1783) were essentially a resistance movement against the British Empire.
- Indigenous Australians in the early history of Australia (1788–1850), including the resistance led by Pemulwuy (d. 1802), during the 1851-1900 period by Jandamarra (fl. 1894-97), and others.
- The Serbian rebel army against the Ottoman Empire in the First Serbian Uprising (1804–13)
- Resistance movements against France also emerged during the Napoleonic Wars
  - The 1808 invasion of Spain by Bonaparte sparked a resistance movement composed mostly of the lower classes, who felt that the nobility was simply allowing themselves to fall under French control. Lord Wellington remarked that it was extraordinary that the French had managed to remain in the country for so long (about 4 years).
  - Landsturm – German resistance groups fighting against the French in the Napoleonic Wars.
- Certain Native Americans during Manifest destiny.
  - Tsali – Cherokee tribal member who led a small band of Cherokee people against the United States military during the Trail of Tears era. Executed in exchange for the survival of his band, the band were integrated into the Eastern Band of Cherokee Indians.
  - Osceola – Seminole chief who was influential. Resisted deportation during the period of Indian removal. Led a number of successes until being captured by the United States during faux peace talks, died a few months later in prison.
- During the American Civil War, there were also resistance movements on both sides
  - Bushwhackers were Confederate guerrillas who engaged in raids, robberies, and massacres against the Union forces and affiliated citizens. Continued resisting for some years after the American Civil War ended. Responsible for the Lawrence Massacre
  - Jayhawkers were Union guerrillas who engaged in the same acts as the bushwhackers did, they were also active during Bleeding Kansas, most prominent member was John Brown responsible for the Pottawatomie Massacre and John Brown's raid on Harper's Ferry.
- Carbonari – 19th-century Italian movement resisting Austrian or Bourbon rule.
- The Polish National Government – Underground Polish supreme authority during the January Uprising against Russian occupation of Poland. In 1863–1864, it was a real shadow government supported by majority of Poles, who even paid taxes for it, and was a significant problem for the Okhrana, the secret police of the Russian Empire.
- The Boxer Movement were a secret group, operating in China between the 1880s and early 1900s, that powered the Boxer Rebellion against foreign occupiers.
- Andrés Avelino Cáceres' resistance movement against invading Chilean forces during the War of the Pacific.
- The Kataas-Taasang, Ka-Galang-galangang, Katipunan ng mga Anak Ng Bayan (KKK) was an organization in the Philippines that instigated the Philippine Revolution in 1896 against the Spanish colonials and resulted in the dissolution of the Republic of Biak na Bato and the exile of the Philippine Government, headed by Emillo Aguinaldo.

=== Pre–World War II ===
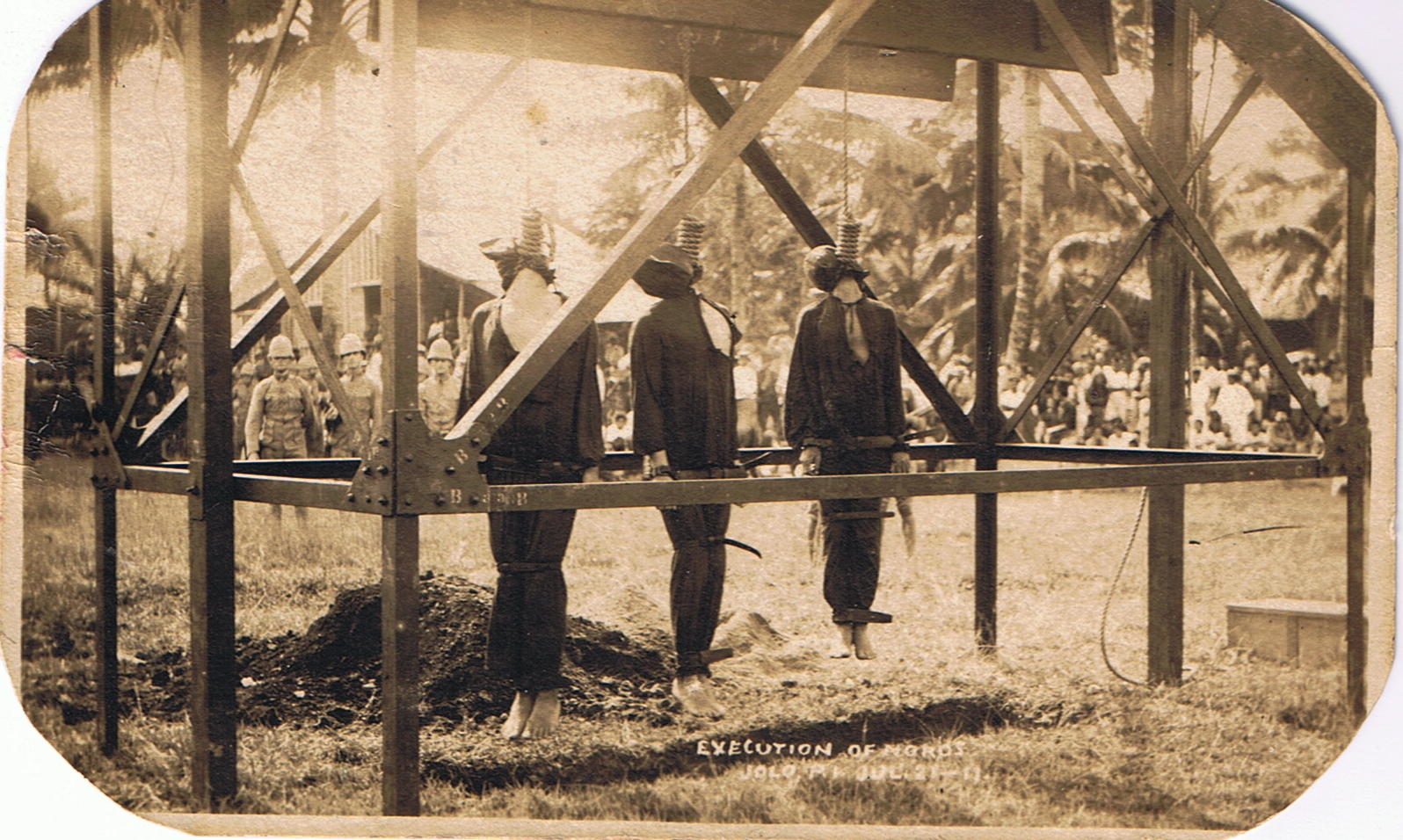
Three Filipino Moro rebels hanged by the Americans in Jolo during the Moro Rebellion

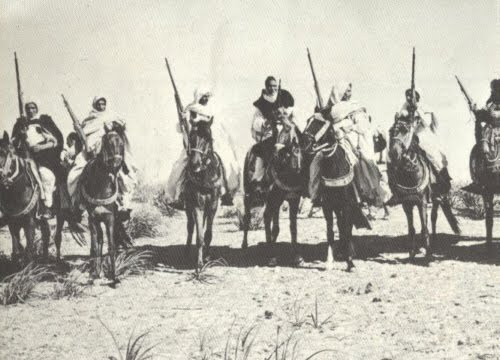
Omar Mukhtar led Libyan Mujahidin against the imperialist forces of Fascist Italy.

- Filipino guerrilla units after official end of Philippine–American War (1902–1913)
- Chinese Communist Party
  - Chinese Red Army
  - Chinese Soviet Republic
  - Communist-controlled China (1927–1949)
  - Fujian People's Government
  - Shaan-Gan-Ning Border Region
- Charlemagne Peralte and his Cacos rebels who resisted the United States occupation of Haiti.
- Freikorps
- Ukrainian forces in the Ukrainian War of Independence (1917-1921)
- Dervish Movement (1899-1920)
- House of Saud
  - Ikhwan
- Forest Guerrillas (1921–1922)
- Augusto César Sandino led a rebellion against the United States occupation of Nicaragua.
- Lwów Eaglets
- Black Lions (1936)
- Irish Republican Army (1918–1922)
- Turkish national movement
  - Association for the Defense of the Rights of Anatolia and Rumelia
- TIGR (1927–1941)
- Ustaše – Croatian nationalist and fascist resistance movement against the Kingdom of Yugoslavia
- White movement and its organizations in the 1920s–1930s:
  - Brotherhood of Russian Truth
  - Russian All-Military Union
- Green armies (1918–1921)
- Committee for the Independence of Georgia

=== World War II ===
- Albanian resistance movement
- Austrian resistance movement (O5)
- Belarusian nationalist resistance movements:
  - Anti-Soviet resistance in Belarus (1944–1950s)
  - Belarusian People's Partisans, anti-Soviet and anti-Nazi
- Belgian resistance movement
- British resistance movements
  - SIS Section D and Section VII (planned Resistance organisations)
  - Resistance in the German-occupied Channel Islands
  - The Auxiliary Units, organized by Colonel Colin Gubbins as a potential British resistance movement against a possible invasion of the British Isles by Nazi forces, note that it was the only resistance movement established prior to invasion, albeit the invasion never came.
- Bulgarian resistance movement
- Burmese resistance movement
- Chechen anti-Soviet resistance
- Chinese resistance movements
  - Anti-Japanese Army for the Salvation of the Country
  - Chinese People's National Salvation Army
  - Heilungkiang National Salvation Army
  - Jilin Self-Defence Army
  - Northeast Anti-Japanese National Salvation Army
  - Northeast Anti-Japanese United Army
  - Northeast People's Anti-Japanese Volunteer Army
  - Northeastern Loyal and Brave Army
  - Northeastern People's Revolutionary Army
  - Northeastern Volunteer Righteous & Brave Fighters
  - Hong Kong resistance movements
    - Gangjiu dadui (Hong Kong-Kowloon big army)
    - East River Column (Dongjiang Guerrillas, Southern China and Hong Kong organisation)
  - Chinese Muslims in the Second Sino-Japanese War
    - Muslim Detachment (回民義勇隊 Huimin Zhidui)
    - Muslim corps
- Czech Resistance movement
- Danish resistance movement
- Dutch resistance movement
  - The Stijkel Group, a Dutch resistance movement, which mainly operated around the S-Gravenhage area.
  - Valkenburg resistance
- Estonian resistance movement
- Forest Brothers
- French resistance movement
  - Bureau Central de Renseignements et d'Action (BCRA)
  - Conseil National de la Résistance (CNR)
  - Francs-Tireurs et Partisans (FTP)
  - Free French Forces (FFL)
  - French Forces of the Interior (FFI)
  - Maquis
  - Pat O'Leary Line
- German resistance to Nazism
  - Bästlein-Jacob-Abshagen Group
  - Confessing Church
  - Edelweiss Pirates
  - Ehrenfeld Group
  - European Union
  - Kreisau Circle
  - National Committee for a Free Germany
    - Anti-Fascist Committee for a Free Germany
  - Neu Beginnen
  - Red Orchestra
  - Robert Uhrig Group
  - Saefkow-Jacob-Bästlein Organization
  - Solf Circle
  - Vierergruppen in Hamburg, Munich and Vienna
  - White Rose
- German pro-Nazi resistance
  - Volkssturm – a German resistance group and militia created by the NSDAP near the end of World War II
  - Werwolf – German guerrillas resisting Allied occupation of Germany, 1945
- Greek resistance movement
  - List of Greek Resistance organizations
  - Cretan resistance
  - National Liberation Front (EAM) and the Greek People's Liberation Army (ELAS), EAM's guerrilla forces
  - National Republican Greek League (EDES)
  - National and Social Liberation (EKKA)
- Hungarian resistance movement, anti-fascist anti-Axis movement against the Horthy regime and the Government of National Unity
- Indian resistance movements:
  - Quit India Movement, largely non-violent anti-British resistance within Indian territory
  - Azad Hind
    - Indian National Army, Indian force fighting alongside the Empire of Japan against Allied forces
    - Free Indian Army, Indian unit in Nazi Germany fighting against the Allies for India's Independence
- Italian resistance against fascism
  - Arditi del Popolo
  - Assisi Network
  - Brigate Fiamme Verdi
  - Comitato di Liberazione Nazionale
  - Concentrazione Antifascista Italiana
  - DELASEM
  - Democrazia Cristiana
  - Four days of Naples
  - Giustizia e Libertà
  - Italian Civil War
  - Italian Co-Belligerent Army, Navy, and Air Force
  - Italian Communist Party (PCI)
  - Italian Partisan Republics
  - Italian Socialist Party (PSI)
  - Labour Democratic Party (PDL)
  - Movimento Comunista d'Italia
  - National Liberation Committee for Northern Italy
  - Partito d'Azione
  - Scintilla
- Italian pro-fascist resistance
  - Black Brigades
  - Italian guerrilla war in Ethiopia
- Political dissidence in the Empire of Japan
  - Dissent in the Armed Forces of the Empire of Japan
  - Japanese in the Chinese resistance to the Empire of Japan
    - Japanese Communist Party
    - Japanese People's Emancipation League
    - Japanese People's Anti-war Alliance
    - League to Raise the Political Consciousness of Japanese Troops
- Japanese pro-imperial resistance
  - Japanese holdout
  - Volunteer Fighting Corps
- Jewish resistance movement, including Jewish partisans and Jewish Anti-Fascist Committee
  - Resistance movement in Auschwitz
- Korean resistance movement
  - Provisional Government of the Republic of Korea
    - Korean Liberation Army
  - Korean Volunteer Army
- Latvian resistance movement
- Lithuanian resistance
- Lithuanian, Latvian, and Estonian (Forest Brothers, Latvian national partisans, and Lithuanian partisans) resistance movements during the Soviet invasion and occupation of the Baltic countries (continued after the end of World War II).
- Luxembourgish resistance movement
- Norwegian resistance movement
- Philippine resistance movement (Multiple, often opposing organizations, were active during the Japanese Occupation)
- Polish Underground State and Polish resistance organizations, such as:
  - Armia Krajowa (the Home Army), Polish underground army in World War II (400 000 sworn members)
  - Narodowe Siły Zbrojne
  - Bataliony Chłopskie
  - Gwardia Ludowa (the People's Guard) and Armia Ludowa (the People's Army)
  - Żydowska Organizacja Bojowa (ZOB, the Jewish Fighting Organisation), Jewish resistance movement that led the Warsaw Ghetto Uprising in 1943
  - Zydowski Zwiazek Walki (ZZW, the Jewish Fighting Union), Jewish resistance movement that led the Warsaw Ghetto Uprising in 1943
- Romanian anti-fascist anti-Axis resistance and political opposition
  - Tudor Vladimirescu Division and Horea, Cloșca și Crișan Division of the Red Army
- The "Republic of Rossony" formed by a group of Soviet partisans, described as "neither for the Soviets nor the Germans"
- The so-called "Russian Liberation Movement" attempted to create an independent (either allied with Germany or opposing both sides) Russian anti-Communist force by means of collaboration with the Nazis
  - Committee for the Liberation of the Peoples of Russia and the Russian Liberation Army within the Wehrmacht, formally released from German command in January 1945, switched sides in May 1945
  - GULAG Operation
  - Russian People's Liberation Army, pro-Nazi militia of the Lokot Autonomy, later absorbed as a part of the Waffen-SS, reformed as an anti-Soviet partisan movement after the war
- Slovak resistance movement
- Soviet resistance movement of Soviet partisans and underground which had Moscow-organized and spontaneously-formed cells opposing German occupation.
  - Belarusian Soviet partisans
  - Estonian Soviet partisans
  - Latvian Soviet partisans
  - Moldovan Soviet partisans
  - Soviet partisans in Finland
  - Soviet partisans in Poland
  - Young Guard (Soviet resistance)
- Thai resistance movement
- Ukrainian resistance movements:
  - Ukrainian Insurgent Army (anti-German, anti-Soviet and anti-Polish resistance movement)
  - Ukrainian People's Revolutionary Army (anti-German, anti-Soviet and anti-Polish resistance movement)
- Yugoslav resistance movements:
  - Yugoslav Army in the Homeland - the Chetniks
    - Blue Guard – Slovenian Chetniks
  - National Liberation Army – the Partisans
    - Croatian Partisans
    - Macedonian Partisans
    - Serbian Partisans
    - Slovene Partisans
- Viet Minh

=== Post–World War II ===
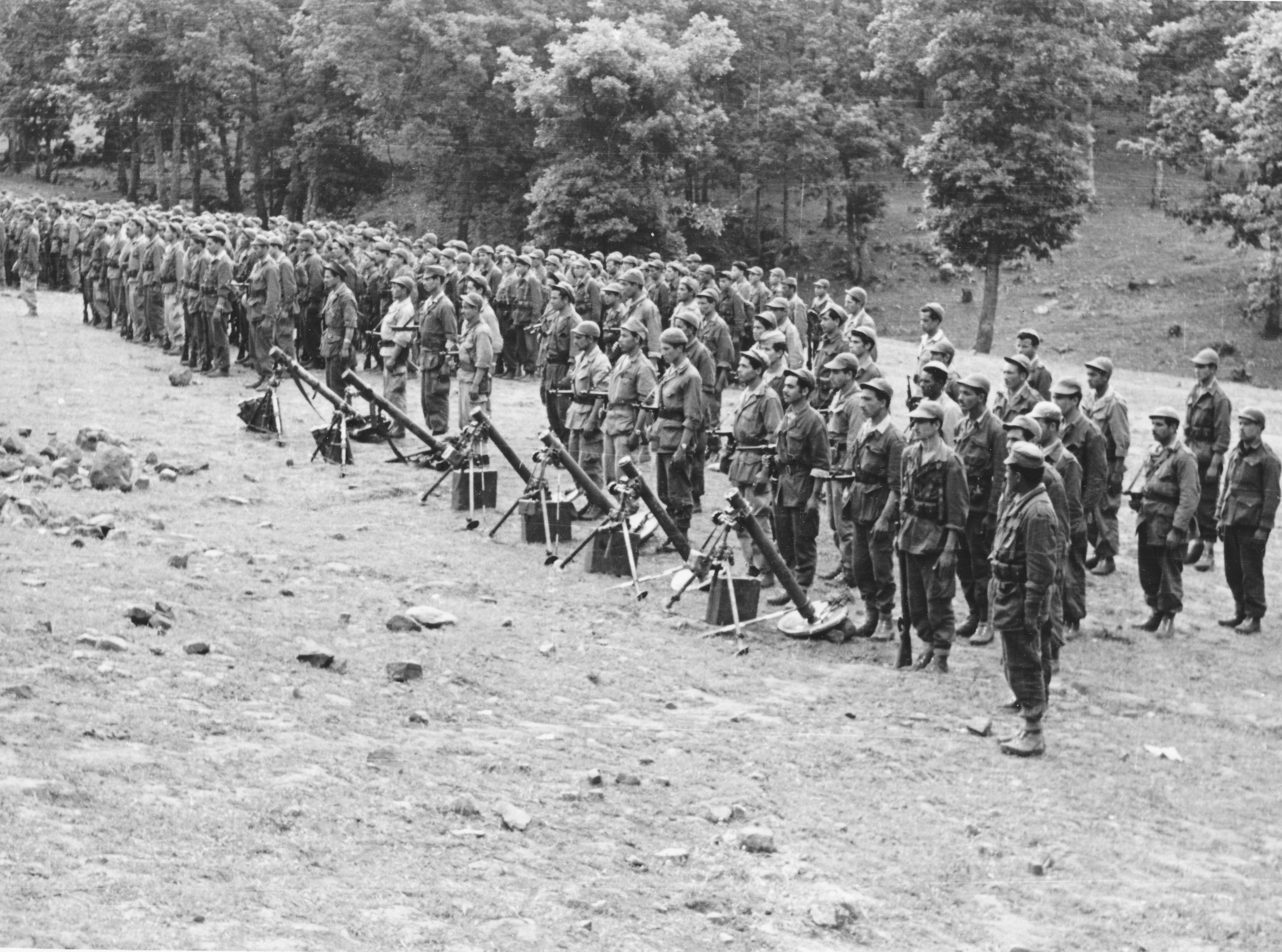
Algerian National Liberation Army during the Algerian War against French occupation

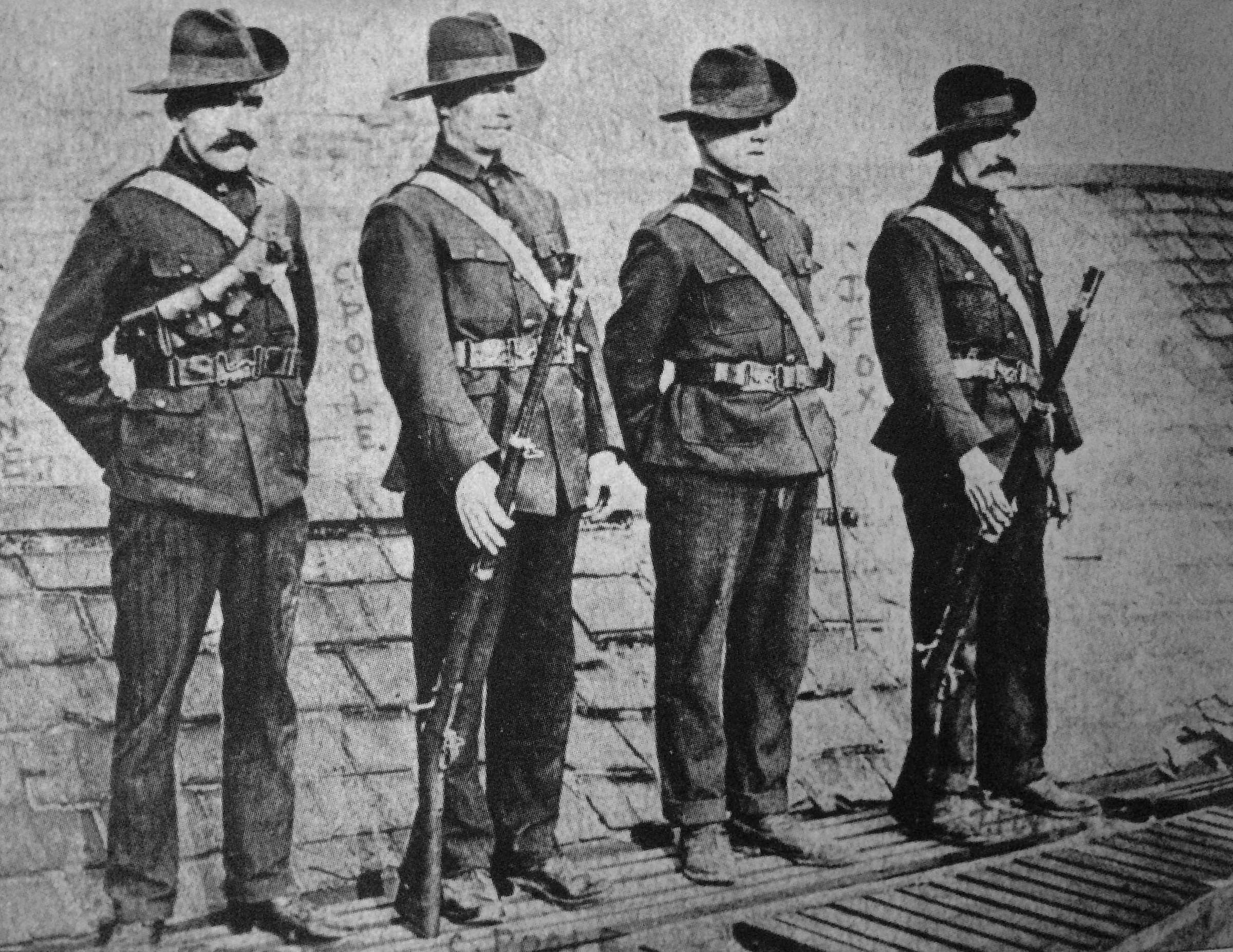
Irish Citizen Army

- Post-WWII anti-fascism (ongoing)

==== Africa ====
- Casamance conflict (ongoing)
- Conflict in the Niger Delta (ongoing)
- Front for the Liberation of the Enclave of Cabinda (Frente para a Libertação do Enclave de Cabinda) (ongoing)
- Harakat al-Shabaab Mujahideen (ongoing)
- Lord's Resistance Army (ongoing)
- Mai-Mai (ongoing)
- March 23 Movement
- Mau Mau
- MPLA
- Ogaden National Liberation Front
- Sudanese resistance (ongoing)
- Umkhonto we Sizwe/African National Congress
- ActionSA/Afrikaner Resistance Movement/MK Party/Economic Freedom Fighters/Cape Independence Party/Referendum Party and others in Post-Apartheid South Africa
- ZANU–PF

==== East Asia, Southeast Asia, and Oceania ====
- East Turkestan Islamic Movement (ongoing)
- Free Papua Movement (ongoing)
- Kuomintang insurgency in China
  - Kuomintang Islamic insurgency
  - Kuomintang in Burma
- New People's Army (ongoing)
- Pathet Lao
- People's Liberation Army/Chinese Communist Party
- South Thailand insurgency (ongoing)
- Tibetan resistance movement (ongoing)
- Viet Cong
- Viet Minh
- Việt Tân

==== Europe ====
- Albanian insurgency in Yugoslavia
  - Kosovo Liberation Army
  - Kosovo Protection Corps
  - National Liberation Army
  - Liberation Army of Preševo, Medveđa and Bujanovac
- Anti-communist resistance in Poland
  - Cursed soldiers
- Belarusian partisan movement (ongoing)
- Caucasus Emirate
- Crusaders – Croatian Ustaše guerrilla movement fighting against Yugoslav communist forces
- Free Wales Army
- Greek resistance
- Hungarian Uprising
- Insurgency in the North Caucasus (2009-2017)
- Irish republicanism
  - Continuity Irish Republican Army
  - Irish National Liberation Army
  - Irish People's Liberation Organisation
  - Irish Republican Army
  - Óglaigh na hÉireann (ongoing)
  - Provisional Irish Republican Army (1969–1997)
  - Real Irish Republican Army (ongoing)
  - United Irishmen
- Mudiad Amddiffyn Cymru
- National Liberation Front of Corsica (Fronte di Liberazione Naziunale Corsu)
- Prague Spring
- Romanian anti-communist resistance movement
- Spanish Maquis
- Ukrainian resistance during the 2022 Russian invasion of Ukraine (ongoing)

==== Middle East ====
- Armenian resistance
- Afghan Mujahideen
- Ba'athist Syria (ongoing)
  - Assad loyalist insurgency
- Free Patriotic Movement (1988-2005)
- Free Syrian Army (2011-2014; Splinter branches and groups who use the name ongoing)
- Front for the Liberation of the Golan (ongoing)
- General Military Council for Iraqi Revolutionaries (ongoing)
- Gaddafi loyalism (ongoing)
- Insurgency in the Maghreb (2002–present) (ongoing)
- Iraqi insurgency (2003–2011)
- Taliban (2001 to 2021)
- Islamic Republic of Afghanistan (ongoing)
  - National Resistance Front of Afghanistan
- Hezbollah (ongoing)
- Houthis (Ansar Allah) (ongoing)
- Popular Mobilization Forces
- Lebanese Front/Lebanese Forces (1975–1990)
- National Liberation Front (Algeria)
- Palestinian militants (ongoing)
  - Al Aqsa Martyrs Brigade
  - Democratic Front for the Liberation of Palestine
  - Hamas (ongoing)
  - Palestinian Islamic Jihad (ongoing)
  - Palestine Liberation Organization (ongoing)
  - Popular Front for the Liberation of Palestine (ongoing)
- Polisario Front (ongoing)
- People's Mujahedin Organization of Iran
- South Yemen Movement (ongoing)

==== Indian subcontinent ====
- Mukti Bahini (1971)
- Bhutan Tiger Force
- Indian Independence movement and Pakistan movement
- Insurgency in Jammu and Kashmir (ongoing)
- Khalistan (ongoing)
- Sindhudesh (ongoing)
- Tamil Tigers

==== Western hemisphere ====
- American Indian Movement
- Black Guerrilla Family (ongoing)
- Black Panther Party
- Boricua Popular Army
- Contras of Nicaragua
- Farabundo Marti National Liberation Front
- Revolutionary Armed Forces of Colombia (ongoing)
- Front de libération du Québec
- Fruit of Islam
- Fuerzas Armadas de Liberación Nacional Puertorriqueña
- Guatemalan National Revolutionary Unity
- Los Macheteros – Puerto Rican armed independence movement (ongoing)
- MOVE
- Montoneros, Ejército Revolucionario del Pueblo, Peronist Armed Forces of Argentina
- Ñancahuazú Guerrilla
- Paraguayan People's Army (ongoing)
- Popular Revolutionary Army (ongoing)
- Sandinistas
- Shining Path (ongoing)
- Symbionese Liberation Army
- Túpac Amaru Revolutionary Movement
- Tupamaros
- Weather Underground
- Zapatistas (ongoing)

== See also ==
- Anti-war
- Anti-capitalism
- Anti-communism
- Anti-fascism
- Anti-imperialism
- Asymmetric warfare
- Civil resistance
- Civil rights movement
- Collaborationism (and Collaboration), the opposite of resistance
- Definitions of terrorism
- Guerrilla warfare
- Insurgency
- Irregular military
- Liberation army
- List of guerrillas
- List of revolutions and rebellions
- Nonviolent resistance
- Partisan (military)
- Rebellion
- Riot
- Social change
- Unconventional warfare

== General references ==
- Gardam, Judith Gail (1993). Non-combatant Immunity as a Norm of International Humanitarian, Martinus Nijhoff. ISBN 0-7923-2245-2.
- Ticehurst, Rupert. "The Martens Clause and the Laws of Armed Conflict " 30 April 1997, International Review of the Red Cross no. 317, pp. 125–34. ISSN 1560-7755
