= Liberation Army =

Liberation Army may refer to: liberation armies

== General ==
- Earth Liberation Army
- National Liberation Army (disambiguation)

== Africa ==
- Army for the Liberation of Rwanda
- Azanian People's Liberation Army
- Biafra Liberation Army
- Caprivi Liberation Army
- Moroccan Army of Liberation
- Sudan People's Liberation Army

== Asia ==
- Arab Liberation Army
- Liberation Tigers of Tamil Eelam
- Balochistan Liberation Army
- Palestinian Liberation Army
- Liberation Army of Kampuchea
- Karen National Liberation Army
- Korean Liberation Army
- Malayan National Liberation Army
- People's Liberation Army, the armed forces of the People's Republic of China
- Liberation Army of South Vietnam
  - Viet Cong, formally the "National Liberation Front of South Vietnam"

== Europe ==
- Bavarian Liberation Army
- Cornish National Liberation Army
- Greek People's Liberation Army
- Irish National Liberation Army
- Kosovo Liberation Army
- Liberation Army of Chameria
- National Liberation Army (Macedonia)
- Macedonian Partisans, formally the "National Liberation Army and Partisan Detachments of Macedonia"
- Russian Liberation Army
- Scottish National Liberation Army
- Ukrainian Liberation Army

== America ==
- Black Liberation Army
- National Liberation Army (Colombia)
- Liberation Army of the South
- Popular Liberation Army
- Symbionese Liberation Army
- Zapatista Army of National Liberation
