= The Stijkel Group =

The Stijkel Group (Dutch: Stijkelgroep) was a Dutch resistance group that fought the Nazi occupation of the Netherlands during the Second World War. They operated between 1940 and 1942.

In April 1941, forty-three men and four women of the Stijkel Group were betrayed and captured. Thirty-two were executed in Berlin following a secret trial before a German military court. The others were sentenced to prison camps. Following the war, those who had been executed were re-interred in Westduin Cemetery in The Hague, and the present monument was erected.

== Han Stijkel ==
Han Stijkel was the leader of the Stijkel Group. He commanded the group until their betrayal in 1942. He was the first of the group to be executed in Berlin.

== Sources ==
- Harald Poelchau, 1949: Die letzten Stunden. Erinnerungen eines Gefängnispfarrers (illustrations by A. Stenbock-Fermor). Berlin: Volk und Welt
- Bert J. Davidson, 2014: Het dagboek van Barend Davidson. Een Zwolse Jood in het verzet (ed. Menno van der Laan). Eindhoven: DATO ISBN 9789462260948
