= Anti-Japanese Army for the Salvation of the Country =

Guerrilla troops in the State of Manchukuo

The Anti-Japanese Army for the Salvation of the Country was a volunteer army led by Li Hai-ching resisting the pacification of Manchukuo. It had about 10,000 guerrilla troops described as being equipped with light artillery and numerous machine guns. They operated in the south of Kirin—now Heilongjiang—province. Li established his headquarters at Fuyu and was in control of the territory around there and southward as far as Nungan.

== See also ==
- Japanese invasion of Manchuria
- Pacification of Manchukuo
- Second Sino-Japanese War

== Expand reading ==
- Jowett, Phillip S., Rays of The Rising Sun, Armed Forces of Japan's Asian Allies 1931-45, Volume I: China & Manchuria, 2004. Helion & Co. Ltd., 26 Willow Rd., Solihull, West Midlands, England.
- Wisconsin Rapids Daily Tribune. March 29, 1932. via NewspaperArchive.
- "Earthly Paradise". Time. May 2, 1932.
