= Vierergruppe (German Resistance) =

A Vierergruppe ("group of four") was a small German resistance group that fought the National Socialists. There were three "groups of four" working simultaneously and independently of each other in Hamburg, Munich and Vienna.

Each of the groups consisted of four young males aged 16 to 18 and each group was led by someone whose precociousness set him apart.

The groups had no political agenda, no background in party politics and moved in a religious environment. All twelve young men came from predominantly Christian, lower- and lower-middle-class families. All were influenced by having heard foreign radio broadcasts, which affected their actions. All of them used leaflets and wall slogans to agitate against the war, against the regime of Adolf Hitler and the Nazis, and all came to the conclusion that the war Germany was leading, then two years old, could not be won. They all hoped for an Allied invasion and victory and the resulting liberation from the domination of the Nazi regime.

== Vierergruppe Hamburg ==
The Hamburg group centered around Helmuth Hübener, a 16-year-old Mormon. He and his friends listened to "enemy radio" broadcasts of the BBC and then transcribed the news reports as leaflets, which they then disseminated. Hübener and his friends Karl-Heinz Schnibbe, age 17, and Rudolf Wobbe, age 16, also Mormons and a co-worker, Gerhard Düwer made their own dissident documents and satirical verses and began distributing the leaflets in working-class neighborhoods in August 1941. The 60 leaflets, containing three to five pages each, were prepared on a church typewriter and left in telephone booths, mailboxes and the lobbies of buildings.

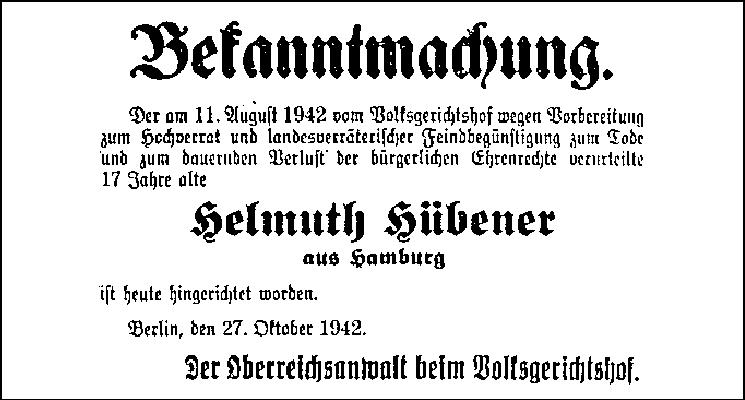
Announcement of Hübener's execution on October 27, 1942

At the end of January 1942, Hübener and Düwer asked an acquaintance to translate their leaflets into French and were observed and afterward denounced. Hübener, Schnibbe and Wobbe were arrested by the Gestapo on February 5, 1942. Schnibbe and Wobbe were arrested a few days later. They were tried on August 11, 1942 before the Nazi People's Court. Hübener took full responsibility for the group, its actions and the fliers. He was sentenced to death for conspiracy to commit high treason and for aiding and abetting the enemy, his three co-defendants were condemned to prison terms of 4–10 years and spent the rest of the war in prison. Hübener was executed at the age of 17 on October 27, 1942 at Plötzensee Prison in Berlin.

== Vierergruppe Munich ==
Munich resident Walter Klingenbeck, who was raised in a religious Catholic environment, regularly listened to German-language broadcasts of "enemy radio" stations, such as the BBC and Radio Vatican with his friends, Hans Haberl, Daniel von Recklinghausen and a fourth, only peripherally involved. After the BBC called for the V for Victory sign of the Allies to be spread about, they decided to do their part. Klingenbeck and von Recklinghausen painted the "V sign" on some 40 buildings in Munich. They were planning to produce leaflets and even to build a pirate radio transmitter, but before they were able to carry these plans out, Klingenbeck, Haberl and von Recklinghausen were arrested in January 1942. Klingenbeck had blabbed about what they had done and was denounced.

On September 24, 1942, Klingenbeck, Haberl and von Recklinghausen were sentenced to death, the fourth member of the group was sentenced to 8 years at hard labor in a zuchthaus. The following August, Haberl and von Recklinghausen had their sentences reduced to 8 years in a zuchthaus. Klingenbeck was executed on August 5, 1943 in Munich at Stadelheim Prison.

== Vierergruppe Vienna ==
Josef Landgraf, a high school student in Vienna, listened to banned radio stations and in autumn of 1941, began to create leaflets from what they heard. He was denounced three weeks later, but in that time, had already produced 70 leaflets and an equal number of stickers. The leaflets discussed the anti-religious activities of the Nazi Party and a critical comparison of Nazi propaganda with reports from the BBC. Three of his classmates, Ludwig Igalffy, Friedrich Fexer and Anton Brunner, helped him produce and disseminate the leaflets. Brunner had already been arrested by the Nazis in May 1938, and had spent his 16th birthday on May 29, 1938 in prison.

Landgraf was arrested at the entrance of his school, in possession of anti-nazi leaflets. Igalffy and Fexer were arrested on January 19, 1942 and the Gestapo arrested Brunner the next day. Landgraf and Brunner were convicted and sentenced to death on August 28, 1942 by the Nazi "People's Court". The other two were sentenced to eight and six years in prison. Brunner's sentence was reduced on March 15, 1943. Landgraf's sentence was reduced to seven years in prison after spending 406 days on death row.

== Legacy ==
In 1998, a lane in the center of Munich, previously unnamed, was named after Klingenbeck. A realschule in Taufkirchen is also named for him.

Hübener and the Hamburg group have been the subject of several books and dramatic works, including the 1969 book by Günter Grass, called Local Anaesthetic, about the Hamburg group. A documentary called "Truth & Conviction," was released in 2002 about Hübener and his friends. It was written and directed by Rick McFarland and Matt Whitaker and sponsored by Brigham Young University. A movie, "Truth & Treason", starring Haley Joel Osment and Max von Sydow, due to be released in 2011, is being produced by the makers of the documentary.

In 2004, a traveling exhibit, "Widerstandsgruppe Landgraf" (Landgraf Resistance Group), was organized under the auspices of Vienna's Landstrasse Museum, in cooperation with JUNA, an independent research group dedicated to documenting history from eyewitnesses, especially that of youth in Nazi Germany, both their involvement in and resistance to Nazism. The opening of the exhibit was attended by two surviving members of the Vierergruppe Vienna, Josef Landgraf and Ludwig Igalffy.

On October 26, 2007, a commemorative plaque dedicated to Anton Brunner, who later became a priest, was unveiled in the Emmersdorf suburb of Melk, Austria.

== See also ==
List of Germans who resisted Nazism

== Additional sources ==
- Jürgen Zarusky: ...nur eine Wachstumskrankheit? Jugendwiderstand in Hamburg und München. In: Dachauer Hefte 7 (1991), ISSN 0257-9472 (in German)
- Freisinger, Tina: Widerstand gegen das Dritte Reich am Beispiel Münchner Jugendlicher : Walter Klingenbeck. - München-Pullach : s.n., 2000 (in German)
- Gleißner, Ruth-Maria: Der Hitler soll das Maul nicht so voll nehmen : das kurze Leben des Walter Klingenbeck. - München : Bayer. Rundfunk, 2004 (in German)
