= Northeastern Volunteer Righteous and Brave Fighters =

1931–33 anti-Japanese guerilla group

Northeastern Counter-Japanese Volunteer Righteous and Brave Fighters
- Simplified Chinese: 东北抗日义勇军
- Traditional Chinese: 東北抗日義勇軍
Transcriptions
Standard Mandarin
- Hanyu Pinyin: Dōngběi Kàngrì Yìyǒngjūn

Flag of the Northeastern Volunteer Righteous and Brave Fighters.

Northeastern Volunteer Righteous and Brave Fighters is a general term for the anti-Japanese armed forces such as the Volunteer Army, the National Salvation Army, and the Self-Defense Force, which were formed by civilians, police, and some officers and soldiers of the Northeast Army in Northeast China after the Mukden incident. Among them, the anti-Japanese armed forces formed by the Chinese Communist Party (CCP) were also included.

The Volunteers had no unified leadership and organization, and each had considerable independence. Military expenses were mainly self-raised or donated. They mainly used light weapons and even swords and spears, and used guerrilla warfare as the main combat method to attack the enemy. In 1932, the Kwantung Army, in cooperation with the Manchukuo Imperial Army, mobilized hundreds of thousands of troops to attack the Volunteers. A large-scale offensive and defensive battle broke out between the two sides. The Volunteers had dealt a heavy blow to the Kwantung Army, but it also suffered huge losses. In 1933, the Volunteers collapsed under the full-scale attack of the Japanese Army. Some retreated into the Inner China, and some formed the Northeastern People's Revolutionary Army with the anti-Japanese guerrillas led by the CCP, becoming the predecessor of the Northeast Anti-Japanese United Army.

== See also ==
- "The March of the Volunteers", known in Chinese as "The Righteous and Brave Army March"
- Japanese invasion of Manchuria
- Pacification of Manchukuo
- Second Sino-Japanese War
