= Right-wing terrorism =

Form of terrorism motivated by right-wing or far-right beliefs

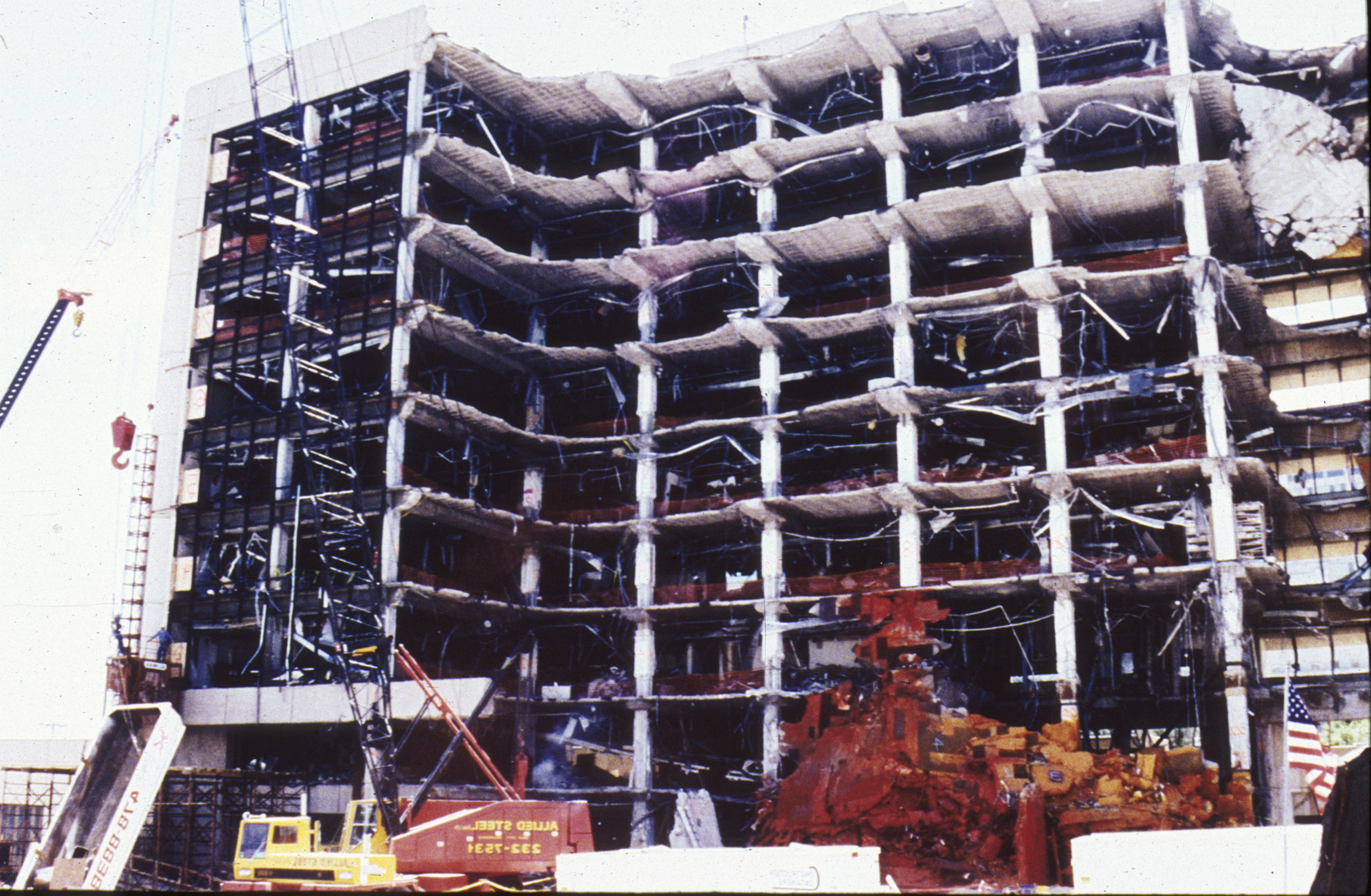
The Alfred P. Murrah Federal Building in the aftermath of the Oklahoma City bombing, April 1995. The bombing was perpetrated by Timothy McVeigh and was motivated by anti-government beliefs.

Right-wing terrorism, hard right terrorism, extreme right terrorism or far-right terrorism is terrorism that is motivated by a variety of different right-wing and far-right ideologies. It can be motivated by racism, ultraconservatism, nationalism, neo-Nazism, extreme anti-communism, neo-fascism, Islamofascism, ecofascism, ethnonationalism, religious nationalism, anti-immigration, anti-multiculturalism, antisemitism, Islamophobia, anti-government sentiment, patriot movements, secessionist or sovereign citizen beliefs, opposition to abortion, ableism, anti-homeless people sentiment, anti-poor people sentiment, misogyny or homophobia. Modern right-wing terrorism largely emerged in Western Europe in the 1970s, and after the Revolutions of 1989 and the dissolution of the Soviet Union in 1991, it emerged in Eastern Europe and Russia.

Right-wing terrorists aim to overthrow governments and replace them with right-wing regimes. They believe that their actions will trigger events that will ultimately lead to the establishment of these authoritarian governments. Although they frequently take inspiration from Fascist Italy and Nazi Germany with some exceptions, right-wing terrorist groups frequently lack a rigid ideology. Right-wing terrorists tend to target people who they consider members of foreign communities, but they may also target political opponents, such as left-wing groups and individuals. The attacks which are perpetrated by right-wing terrorists are not indiscriminate attacks which are perpetrated by individuals and groups which simply seek to kill people; the targets of these attacks are carefully chosen. Because the targets of these attacks are often entire sections of communities, they are not targeted as individuals, instead, they are targeted because they are representatives of groups which are considered foreign, inferior and threatening by them.

According to an analysis by the Institute for Economics and Peace, there has been a surge in far-right terror incidents since 2010, with a 320% increase between 2014 and 2018.

== Causes ==
=== Economy ===
German economist Armin Falk et al. wrote in a 2011 article that Right-Wing Extremist Crime (REC), which includes xenophobic and racist motivations, is associated with unemployment rates; as unemployment rates increase, REC also increases. A 2014 paper argues that right-wing terrorism increases with economic growth, seemingly due to its proponents often being people who lose out under economic modernisation. Conversely, a 2019 study found that economic predictors did not predict right-wing terrorism in Europe, rather, levels of extra-European immigration did; right-wing terrorists did not want immigrants in their countries and they sought to drive them out with force. Thus, increased migration caused greater resentment and thus, their greater resentment was a greater motive for their attacks.

=== Right-wing populist politics ===
In 2016, Thomas Greven suggested that right-wing populism is a cause of right-wing terrorism. More simply put, populism supports the advancement of "the average citizen", not the agendas of the privileged elite. Greven defines right-wing populists as those who support ethnocentrism, and oppose immigration. Because right-wing populism creates a climate of "us versus them", terrorism is more likely to occur. Vocal opposition to Islamic terrorism by Donald Trump has been obscuring right-wing terrorism in the US, where right-wing terror attacks outnumber Islamist, left-wing, and refugee attacks combined in America.

In the wake of the Christchurch mosque shootings at the Al Noor Mosque and the Linwood Islamic Centre in Christchurch, New Zealand, by terrorist Brenton Harrison Tarrant, expert on terrorism Greg Barton, at Deakin University in Australia (the home country of Tarrant), wrote about the "toxic political environment that allows hate to flourish". Saying that although right-wing extremism in Australia is not nearly as serious as the European neo-Nazi movements or the various types of white supremacy and toxic nationalism seen in American politics, both major parties attempted to win votes by repeating some of the tough language and inhumane policies which appeared to reward right-wing populists. He further argued: "The result has been such a cacophony of hateful rhetoric that it has been hard for those tasked with spotting the emergence of violent extremism to separate it from all the background noise of extremism."

=== Fringe groups ===
According to Moghadam and Eubank (2006), groups which are associated with right-wing terrorism include white power skinhead gangs, far-right hooligans, and their sympathizers. The "intellectual guides" of right-wing terrorist movements espouse the view that the state must "rid itself of the foreign elements that undermine it from within" so the state can "provide for its rightful, natural citizens".

In Australia, experts, police and others have been commenting on the failure of the authorities to act effectively in order to combat right-wing radicalisation, and the government has vowed to put right-wing extremist individuals and groups under greater scrutiny and pressure, with the home affairs secretary Mike Pezzullo making strong comments to a parliamentary committee. A week after the Christchurch mosque shootings in Christchurch, New Zealand, it emerged that three years earlier, Australian-born Brenton Harrison Tarrant, the perpetrator of the shootings, had been active on the Facebook pages of two Australian-based white nationalist groups, the United Patriots Front (UPF) and True Blue Crew (TBC) and praised the UPF's leader neo-Nazi Blair Cottrell as they all celebrated Donald Trump's victory in the 2016 presidential election in the United States. Tarrant was also offered but declined a membership in the Lads Society, a white nationalist fight club which was founded by Cottrell.

In the United States, Brian Levin, director of the Center for the Study of Hate & Extremism at California State University, San Bernardino and former NYPD officer, wrote about the growth of white nationalism by saying that the political climate of polarization "has provided an opportunity for violent bigots, both on- and offline. Times of change, fear and conflict offer extremists and conspiracists a chance to present themselves as an alternative to increasingly distrusted traditional mainstream choices." He quotes former FBI agent Erroll Southers' view that white supremacy "is being globalized at a very rapid pace", and he urged the government to hold hearings to investigate homegrown extremism. Sociologists at the University of Dayton pointed to the origin of white nationalism in the US and its spread to other countries, and they also noted that the Christchurch attacker's hatred of Muslims was inspired by American white nationalism.

The Anti-Defamation League reports that white supremacist propaganda and recruitment efforts both on and around college campuses have been increasing sharply, with 1,187 incidents in 2018 compared to 421 incidents in 2017, far exceeding any previous year. Far-right terrorists rely on a variety of strategies such as leafleting, the performance of violent rituals, and house parties in order to recruit, mostly targeting angry and marginalized youth who are looking for solutions to their problems. But their most effective recruitment tool is extremist music, which avoids monitoring by moderating parties such as parents and school authorities. Some risk factors which are facilitating recruitment include exposure to racism during childhood, dysfunctional families such as divorced parents, neglect, and physical, emotional and sexual abuse.

== Role of the media ==
=== Social media ===
Social media platforms have been one of the principal means by which right-wing extremist ideas and hate speech have been shared and promulgated, leading to extensive debates about the limits of free speech and their impact on terrorist actions and hate crimes. In 2018, researchers in the US identified the YouTube recommendation system as promoting a range of political positions from mainstream libertarianism and conservatism to overt white nationalism. Many other online discussion groups and forums are used for online right-wing radicalization. Robert Bowers the perpetrator of the Pittsburgh synagogue shooting at Tree of Life - Or L'Simcha Congregation in Pittsburgh, Pennsylvania, was a user on Gab, a "free speech" alternative to Twitter, and spread antisemitic, neo-Nazi, and Holocaust denial propaganda as well as interacted with or reposted at least five alt-right figures: Brad "Hunter Wallace" Griffin of Occidental Dissent and League of the South (LS), Daniel "Jack Corbin" McMahon, a self-described "Antifa Hunter" and "fascist", former California Republican Patrick Little, Jared Wyand of Project Purge and Daniel "Grandpa Lampshade" Kenneth Jeffreys of The Daily Stormer and Radio Aryan. Twitter was found to be offering advertisements targeted to 168,000 users in a white genocide conspiracy theory category, which they removed shortly after being contacted by journalists in the wake of the Pittsburgh synagogue shooting. After a Brooklyn synagogue was vandalized with death threats, the term "Kill all Jews" was listed as a trending topic on Twitter.

Australian-born terrorist Brenton Harrison Tarrant the perpetrator of the Christchurch mosque shootings at Al Noor Mosque and Linwood Islamic Centre in Christchurch, New Zealand, recorded a video of the attacks on Facebook Live which was shared extensively on social media as well as spreading his manifesto The Great Replacement on his Facebook and Twitter accounts and on 8chan /pol/ where he would announce the attacks and prior to this his social media was filled with white nationalist, anti-Islamic and neo-fascist material and his profile picture was "The Australian Shitposter" an image of a tanned, blonde-haired Akubra hat wearing man from Australia used to represent users on 4chan and 8chan as well as the alt-right subculture "The Dingoes". The government of New Zealand already had laws in place relating to terrorism under which people sharing the video can be prosecuted, and it was announced that this would be vigorously pursued. Prime Minister Jacinda Ardern also vowed to investigate the role played by social media in the attack and take action, possibly alongside other countries, against the sites that broadcast the video.

Facebook and Twitter became more active in banning extremists from their platform in the wake of the tragedy. Facebook pages associated with Future Now Australia had been removed from the platform, including their main page, Stop the Mosques and Save Australia. Far-right activist leaders in Australia urged their supporters to follow them on Gab after being banned from Twitter and Facebook. On March 28, 2019, Facebook announced that they have banned white nationalist and white separatist content along with white supremacy. Patrick Crusius, the man responsible for the 2019 El Paso shooting which killed 23 people and injured 23 others, had prior to the incident liked, posted, and retweeted content on his Twitter account in support of Donald Trump.

=== Mass media ===
Owen Jones wrote in The Guardian about how the press in Britain can play a role in helping to radicalise far-right terrorists, quoting Neil Basu, Britain's counter-terrorism chief. Basu cited the Daily Mail and Daily Mirror as particular culprits, while Jones also give examples from The Times, The Telegraph, The Spectator and others, with articles bemoaning so-called Cultural Marxism and misleading headlines such as "1 in 5 Brit Muslims" sympathizing with jihadists (The Sun).

== Africa ==
=== South Africa ===
In 1993, Chris Hani, general secretary of the South African Communist Party was murdered by the Polish far-right anti-communist Janusz Waluś who was given the firearm by the pro-apartheid parliamentarian Clive Derby-Lewis.

In 2010, South African authorities foiled a plot to commit attacks by far-right terrorists who wanted to avenge the murder of Eugène Terre'Blanche, seizing explosives and firearms.

== Americas ==
=== Argentina ===
The Argentine Patriotic League (Liga Patriótica Argentina) was a Nacionalista paramilitary group, founded in Buenos Aires on January 16, 1919, during the Tragic week. It was merged into the Argentine Civic Legion in 1931.

=== Brazil ===
The Para-SAR example was revealed by Brazilian Air Force captain Sérgio Ribeiro Miranda de Carvalho in 1968 before it reached the execution phase as it was made public to the press after a meeting with his superior Brigadier General João Paulo Burnier and chief of Para-SAR unity. Burnier discussed a secret plan to bomb a dense traffic area of Rio de Janeiro known as "Gasômetro" during commute and later claim that Communists were the perpetrators. He expected to be able to run a witch-hunt against the growing political military opposition. Burnier also mentioned his intentions on making the Para-SAR, a Brazilian Air Force rescue unity, a tool for eliminating some military regime political oppositors throwing them to the sea at a wide distance of the coast. On both of these events, no military involved on these actions or planning was arrested, charged or faced retaliation from the Brazilian military dictatorship. The only exception is captain Sérgio de Carvalho which had to leave the air force for facing his superiors retaliation after whistleblowing brigadier Burnier's plan.

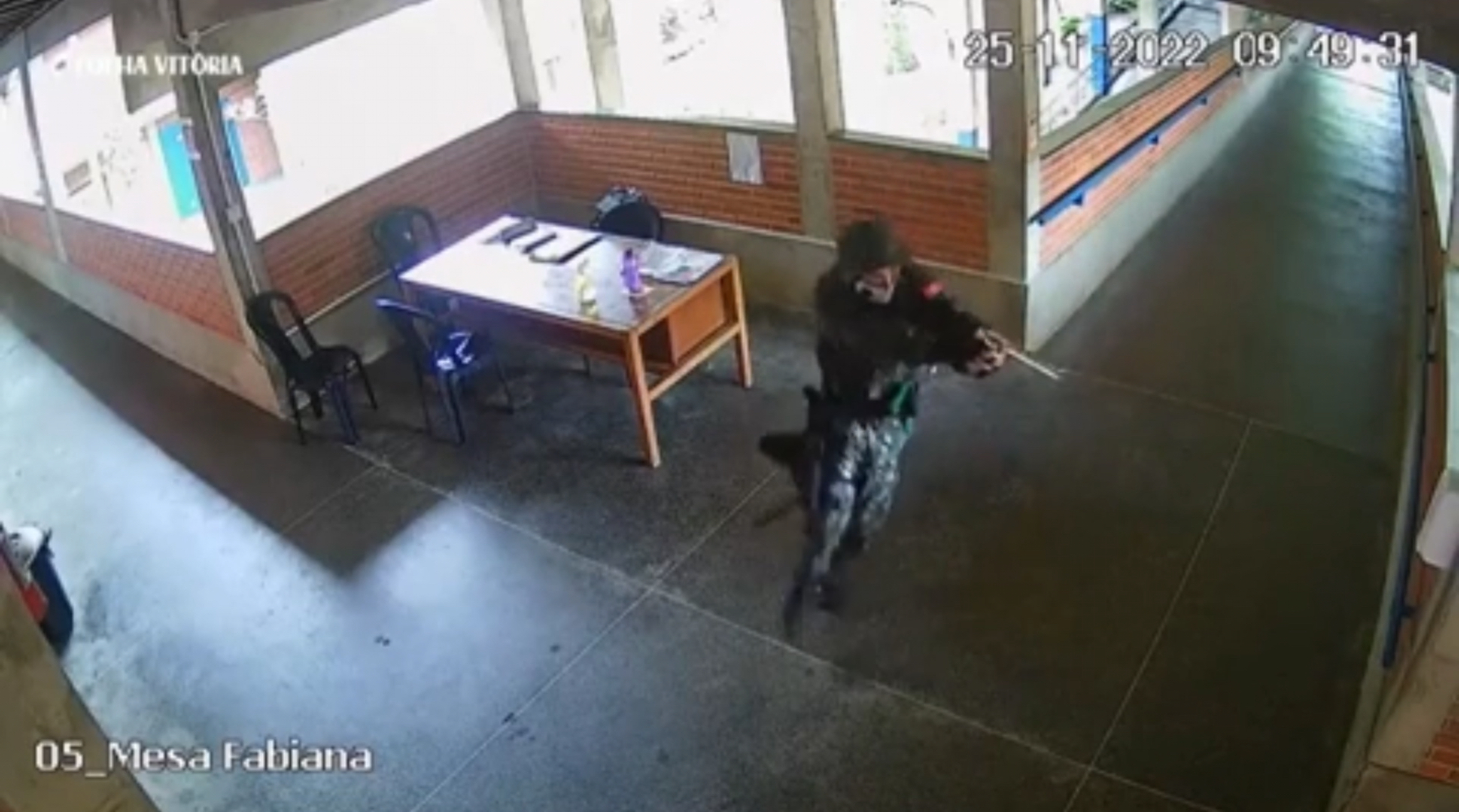
The 2022 Aracruz school shootings, in which four people were killed

On November 25, 2022, shootings took place at two schools in Aracruz, Espírito Santo. Four people died, and 12 others were injured. The suspect, a 16-year-old former student at one of the schools, was arrested approximately four hours later. He was reportedly active in online neo-Nazi communities that promoted accelerationism and during the attacks, he wore attire that strongly resembled uniforms which were worn by members of the terrorist organization Atomwaffen Division.

=== Colombia ===
Colombian paramilitary groups were responsible for most of the human rights violations which were committed during the latter half of the ongoing Colombian conflict. According to several international human rights and governmental organizations, right-wing paramilitary groups were responsible for at least 70 to 80% of political murders in Colombia per year during the 1980s and 1990s. The first paramilitary groups were organized by the Colombian government following recommendations made by U.S. military counterinsurgency advisers who were sent to Colombia in the early 1960s, during the Cold War, to combat leftist political activists and armed guerrilla groups.

These groups were financed and protected by elite landowners, drug traffickers, members of the security forces, right-wing politicians and multinational corporations. Paramilitary violence and terrorism has principally been targeted towards peasants, unionists, indigenous people, human rights workers, teachers and left-wing political activists or their supporters.

=== Nicaragua ===
The Contras were a right-wing militant group, backed by the United States, that fought against the Sandinista National Liberation Front in Nicaragua. They were responsible for numerous human rights violations and carried out over 1300 terrorist attacks.

=== United States ===
Cumulative presentation of politically motivated terrorism since 1975

Annual presentation of politically motivated terrorism since 1990

Cumulatively over five decades, right-wing perpetrators in the US killed substantially more people than left-wing or Islamist-inspired perpetrators (excluding data from the Sept. 11 attacks). In almost all individual years since 1990, right-wing ideologically motivated homicides in the US have substantially outnumbered those perpetrated by left-wing actors.

From 2022 through 2024, all 61 political killings were committed by right-wing extremists.

==== Reconstruction era ====
Scholars label acts of terrorism which were committed against African Americans during the Reconstruction era "white terrorism".

==== Civil rights movement ====
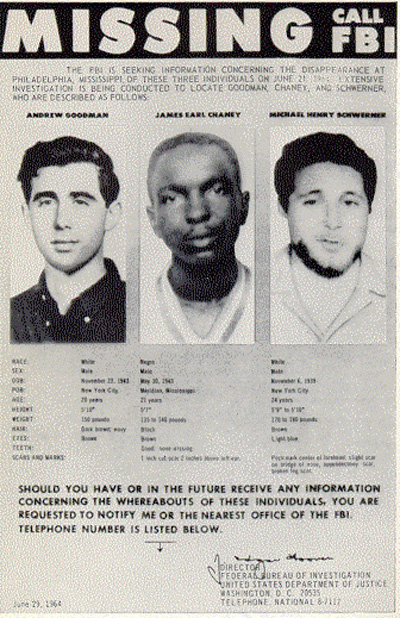
A 1964 Federal Bureau of Investigation poster regarding missing civil rights workers Andrew Goodman (left), James Chaney (middle), and Michael Schwerner, all of them were murdered in Mississippi by members of the Ku Klux Klan on June 21, 1964

According to American political scientist George Michael, "right-wing terrorism and violence has a long history in America". In the aftermath of the Brown v. Board of Education decision (1954), members of a resurgent Ku Klux Klan waged a campaign of terrorism against black people, civil rights activists, Jews, and others. Klansmen bombed the 16th Street Baptist Church in Birmingham, Alabama, in 1963, killing four African American girls and injuring 14–22 others, and they also committed other murders, including those of James Chaney, Andrew Goodman, and Michael Schwerner (1964), Lemuel Penn (1964), Viola Liuzzo (1965), and Michael Donald (1981). Between 1956 and 1963, an estimated 130 bombings were perpetrated in the South.

==== 1980s ====
During the 1980s, more than 75 right-wing extremists were prosecuted for acts of terrorism in the United States, they carried out six attacks. In 1983, Gordon Kahl, a Posse Comitatus member and a white supremacist activist, killed two federal marshals and later, he was killed by police. Also that year, the white nationalist revolutionary group The Order (also known as the Brüder Schweigen or the Silent Brotherhood) robbed banks and armored cars, as well as a sex shop, bombed a theater and a synagogue and murdered radio talk show host Alan Berg.

==== Oklahoma City bombing ====
On April 19, 1995, Gulf War veteran and anti-government extremist Timothy McVeigh detonated an ammonium nitrate bomb out of a Ryder rental truck next to the Alfred P. Murrah Federal Building in Oklahoma City, killing 168 people and injuring 680. It was the deadliest act of domestic terrorism in the history of the United States. McVeigh stated that it was committed in retaliation for the government's actions at Ruby Ridge and Waco. Terry Nichols, a friend of McVeigh, conspired in the plot to construct the bomb.

==== Eric Rudolph ====
Eric Rudolph executed a series of terrorist attacks between 1996 and 1998. He carried out the 1996 Centennial Olympic Park bombing – which claimed two lives and injured 111 – aiming to cancel the games, claiming they promoted global socialism and to embarrass the U.S. government. Rudolph confessed to bombing an abortion clinic in Sandy Springs, an Atlanta suburb, on January 16, 1997, the Otherside Lounge, an Atlanta lesbian bar, on February 21, 1997, injuring five and an abortion clinic in Birmingham, Alabama on January 29, 1998, killing Birmingham police officer and part-time clinic security guard Robert Sanderson and critically injuring nurse Emily Lyons. He was linked an extreme right-wing group.

==== Jewish Defense League ====
The Jewish Defense League is a Jewish religious-political organization in the United States, its stated goal is to "protect Jews from antisemitism by whatever means necessary". The FBI has classified it as "a right wing terrorist group" since 2001, and it has been designated as a hate group by the Southern Poverty Law Center. According to the FBI, the JDL has been involved in plotting and executing acts of terrorism within the United States. As of 2015, most terrorism watchdog groups classified the group as inactive.

==== Events following the September 11 attacks ====
According to a report published by the Center for Strategic and International Studies, as of 2020, right-wing terrorism accounted for the majority of terrorist attacks and plots in the United States. As of June 2023, the New America Foundation placed the number killed in terrorist attacks in the United States since the September 11, 2001 attacks (9/11) as follows: 130 killed in far-right attacks, 107 killed in jihadist attacks, 17 killed in "ideological misogyny/incel" attacks, 12 killed in black separatist/nationalist/supremacist attacks, and 1 killed in a far-left attack.

According to a 2017 Government Accountability Office report, 73% of violent extremist incidents that resulted in deaths since 9/11, were caused by right-wing extremist groups, while radical Islamist extremists were responsible for 27%. The total number of deaths which were caused by each group was about the same, but 41% of the deaths which were attributable to radical Islamists occurred in a single event – the 2016 Orlando nightclub shooting in which 49 people were killed by a lone gunman. No deaths were attributed to left-wing terrorist groups.

==== White backlash, White nationalism, and white supremacy ====
In October 2020, the U.S. Department of Homeland Security reported that white supremacists posed the top domestic terrorism threat, which FBI director Christopher Wray confirmed in March 2021, noting that the bureau had elevated the threat to the same level as the threat which was posed by ISIS.

==== Additional reports ====
A report in The Washington Post, published on November 25, 2018, showed that the number of violent right-wing-related incidents had gone up, and the number of left-wing-related incidents had gone down. In total, the number of domestic terrorism incidents had gone down to 41 in 2001, from a high of 468 in 1970, but then, it went up to 65 in 2017. Of those 65 incidents in 2017, 36 of them were right-wing-related (with 11 fatalities), 10 of them were left-wing-related (with 6 fatalities), 7 of them were related to Islamist extremism (with 16 fatalities), and 12 of them, including the 2017 Las Vegas shooting, were categorized as "Other/Unknown" (with 62 fatalities, including 58 from the Las Vegas incident at the time). The report found that 2018 was a particularly deadly year, with 11 people dying in the Pittsburgh synagogue shooting, 2 others in an incident in Kentucky, and two more in a shooting in Tallahassee. All three incidents were right-wing related.

A 2019 report stated that 50 people in the United States were killed in murders which were committed by domestic extremists (the murders included ideologically and non-ideologically motivated homicides) during the previous year. Of these killings, 78% of them were perpetrated by white supremacists, 16% of them were perpetrated by anti-government extremists, 4% of them were perpetrated by "incel" extremists, and 2% of them were perpetrated by domestic Islamist extremists. Over the broader 2009 to 2018 time period, a total of 313 people were killed by right-wing extremists in the United States (the crimes included ideologically and non-ideologically motivated homicides), of those homicides, 76% of them were committed by white supremacists, 19% of them were committed by anti-government extremists (including those extremists who were affiliated with the militia, "sovereign citizen", tax protester, and "Patriot" movements), 3% of them were committed by "incel" extremists, 1% of them were committed by anti-abortion extremists, and 1% of them were committed by other right-wing extremists.

Soon after the 2025 assassination of Charlie Kirk, U.S. President Trump claimed that "the radicals on the left are the problem" with political violence. Opinion editors, as well as both far-right commentators and Trump critics, have compared Charlie Kirk's killing to the Reichstag fire—the 1933 arson of the German parliament building that Hitler used as a pretext to suspend civil liberties and prosecute political opposition—some calling Kirk's killing Trump's "Reichstag fire moment". How Democracies Die author, professor Steven Levitsky, said that exploiting Charlie Kirk's killing to justify unleashing attacks on critics is "page one of the authoritarian playbook".

After Kirk's assassination, CSIS reported that far-left terrorist attacks and plots outnumbered far-right attacks and plots in 2025 for the first time in more than 30 years. CSIS also noted a sharp decline in overall attacks and plots orchestrated by right-wing perpetrators in recent years, with only one incident recorded in all of 2025, that being the assassinations of Melissa Hortman and her husband.

As of 2023, according to New America's tally, 133 people have been killed in right-wing extremist terrorist attacks since 9/11. The incidents which caused deaths were the following:

Year	Occurrence	Location	Victims Wounded*	Victims Killed*
2023	Jacksonville Dollar General shooting	Jacksonville, Florida	0	3
2023	Allen, Texas outlet mall shooting	Allen, Texas	7	8
2022	Buffalo supermarket shooting	Buffalo, New York	3	10
2020	Boogaloo murders	Oakland, California; Santa Cruz, California	3	2
2019	El Paso Walmart shooting	El Paso, Texas	26	22
2019	Poway synagogue shooting	Poway, California	3	1
2018	Jeffersontown Kroger shooting	Jeffersontown, Kentucky	0	2
2018	Murder of Robert Miller	Murfreesboro, Tennessee	0	1
2018	Pittsburgh synagogue shooting	Pittsburgh, Pennsylvania	7	11
2018	Murder of Blaze Bernstein	Orange County, California	0	1
2018	Murder of MeShon Cooper-Williams	Kansas City, Missouri	0	1
2018	Murders of Danny and Deanna Lorenzo	Lee County, Florida	0	2
2017	Murder of Richard Collins III	College Park, Maryland	0	1
2017	Car-ramming attack into counter-protesters at the white nationalist Unite the Right rally	Charlottesville, Virginia	28	1
2017	Portland train attack	Portland, Oregon	1	2
2017	Murder of Timothy Caughman	New York City, New York	0	1
2015	Shooting at a showing of the film Trainwreck	Lafayette, Louisiana	9	2
2015	Planned Parenthood shooting	Colorado Springs, Colorado	9	3
2015	Charleston church shooting at the Emanuel African Methodist Episcopal Church	Charleston, South Carolina	1	9
2014	Attack on Pennsylvania State Police barracks	Blooming Grove, Pennsylvania	1	1
2014	Ambush attack on Las Vegas police officers	Las Vegas, Nevada		3
2014	Overland Park Jewish Community Center shooting	Overland Park, Kansas		3
2013	Los Angeles International Airport shooting attack on TSA officer	Los Angeles, California	6	1
2013	Double murder committed by Jeremy Lee Moody and Christine Moody	Jonesville, South Carolina	0	2
2012	Ambush attack against St. John the Baptist Parish police	St. John the Baptist Parish, Louisiana	2	2
2012	Wisconsin Sikh temple shooting	Oak Creek, Wisconsin	4	6
2011	Tri-state killing spree by white supremacists David Pedersen and Holly Grigsby	Multiple		4
2011	FEAR group attacks	Georgia		3
2011	Murder of James Craig Anderson	Jackson, Mississippi	0	1
2010	Murder committed by Aryan Brotherhood members	Mississippi	0	1
2010	Shooting at bookstore cafe perpetrated by Ross William Muehlberger	Wichita Falls, Texas	4	1
2010	Murder of Todd Getgen	Carlisle, Pennsylvania	0	1
2009	Murder of sex offender by white supremacists	North Palm Springs, California	0	1
2009	Murder committed by Charles Francis Gaskins	Carmichael, California	0	1
2009	United States Holocaust Memorial Museum shooting	Washington, D.C.	1	1
2009	Assassination of George Tiller	Wichita, Kansas	1	1
2009	Murders of Raul and Brisenia Flores	Arivaca, Arizona	1	2
2009	Shooting of Pittsburgh police officers	Pittsburgh, Pennsylvania	2	3
2008	Woodburn bank bombing	Woodburn, Oregon	2	2
2008	Knoxville Unitarian Universalist church shooting	Knoxville, Tennessee	8	2
2007	Murder of homeless man by Aryan Soldiers		0	1
2006	Murder committed by John Ditullio		1	1
2004	Bank robbery	Tulsa, Oklahoma	0	1
2003	Torture, abduction and murder	Salinas, California	0	1
2001	Post-September 11 shootings	Multiple	1	2
* Count of "victims killed" and "victims wounded" excludes attackers.

==== "Unite the Right" rally ====
The Post reported that the upsurge in right-wing violence began during the Barack Obama administration and picked up steam under the presidency of Donald Trump, whose remarks after the Unite the Right rally in Charlottesville, Virginia, in 2017 that there were "some very fine people on both sides" is widely seen as giving confidence to the right that the administration looked favorably on their goals, providing them with "tacit support". A former FBI assistant director for counterintelligence, is quoted as saying that "[political leaders] from the White House down, used to serve as a check on conduct and speech that was abhorrent to most people. I see that eroding. ... The current political rhetoric is at least enabling, and certainly not discouraging, violence."

According to analysis by the newspaper of data from the Global Terrorism Database, 92 of 263 domestic terrorism events – 35% – that occurred from 2010 to 2017 were right-wing related, while 38 (14%) were Islamist extremist-related, and 34 (13%) were left-wing related. Not only that, but a criminologist from John Jay College stated that right-wing attacks were statistically more likely to result in fatalities.

==== 2021 United States Capitol attack ====
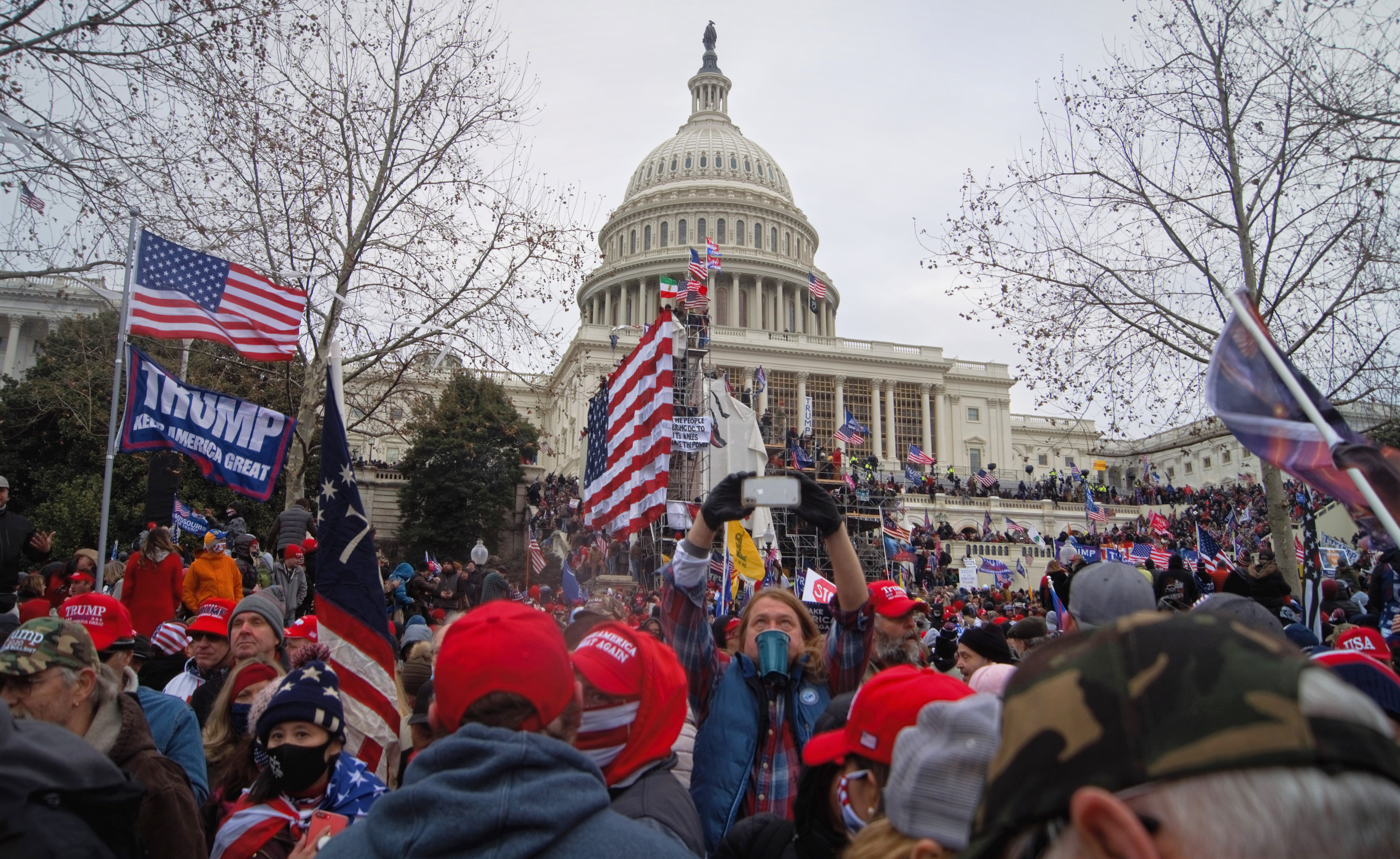
A mob of Trump supporters storm the United States Capitol building on January 6, 2021.

On January 6, 2021, a mob of rioters supporting President Trump's attempts to overturn the 2020 United States presidential election, stormed the U.S. Capitol during speeches which were made by Trump and his allies at a rally. After breaching multiple police perimeters, they damaged and occupied parts of the building for several hours. National Guard units from several states were called up to deal with the violence, while the riots resulted in six deaths (four rioters and two police officers), over 80 arrests, and 116 officers being injured. Several high-profile members of the government and Capitol security resigned, including the chief of the Capitol Police, the Sergeant-at-Arms of both the House of Representatives and the Senate. Over 70 other countries and international organizations expressed their concerns over the protests and condemned the violence. One group involved, the Proud Boys, was designated a terrorist organization in Canada. Since then, at least two dozen Proud Boys members and affiliates have been indicted for their alleged roles in the insurrection.

During congressional testimony two months after the Capitol assault, FBI director Christopher Wray characterized the incident as "domestic terrorism". Although he did not attribute the assault to a specific group, he made clear that the evidence showed a connection to right-wing extremism, particularly militia groups. When asked if "right-wing white supremacist groups played an instrumental role", Wray explained that the FBI did not use labels about political positioning, but agreed "we're basically saying the same thing." Wray testified that the top threat of domestic violent extremists were "specifically those who advocate for the superiority of the white race", alongside the threat posed by ISIL. Despite efforts by many conservatives, including during the congressional hearing, to blame antifa for the attack, Wray reiterated that the FBI had found no evidence to support the allegations. A February 2021 poll found that 58% of Republicans believe the Capitol riot was "mostly an antifa-inspired attack that only involved a few Trump supporters".

== Europe ==
=== Belgium ===
Westland New Post was an underground neo-Nazi terror group in the 1980s. They are suspected of involvement in the Brabant killings in which 28 people were killed over a four-year period.

=== Denmark ===
Neo-Nazis were suspected to have perpetrated the 1992 Copenhagen bombing, in which the office of a left-wing socialist party was attacked, killing one of its members.

=== Finland ===
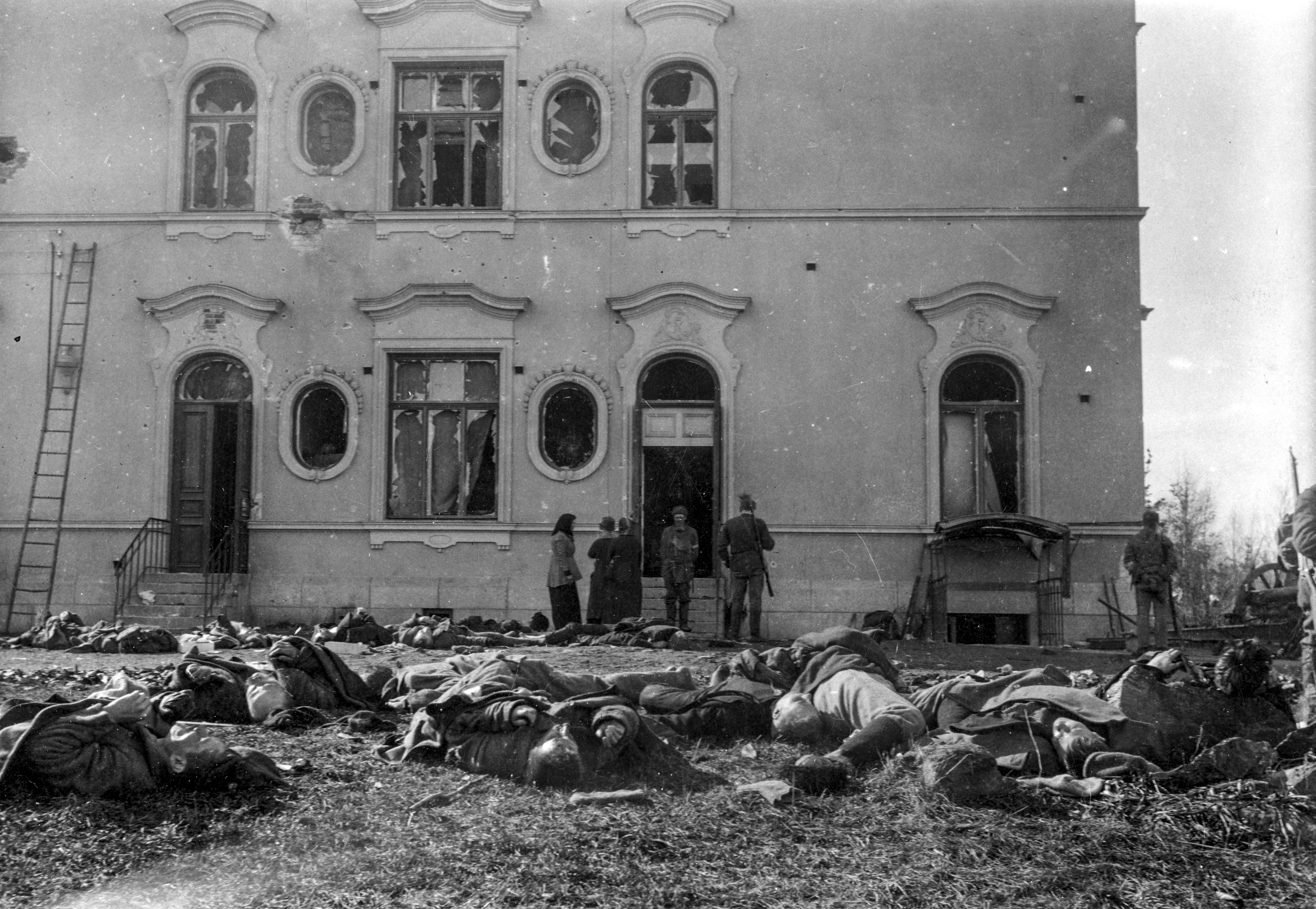
Murdered leftists in Tampere (1918)

In the 1920s–1940s, far-right and fascist groups attacked left-wing events and politicians systematically, resulting in deaths. The groups were responsible for bombing and burning down gathering places of the leftists. Minister of the Interior Heikki Ritavuori was assassinated for supposedly being too lenient towards communists. Conservative and White Guard authorities supported the far-right to a large extent, for instance the social democrat politician Onni Happonen was arrested by police who then turned him over to a fascist lynch mob to be killed.

In 1945, after the armistice with the Soviet Union, nationalist groups bombed multiple left-wing targets in Helsinki. Attacks in Haaga and Vallila against left-wing papers and meeting halls followed. A group identifying themselves as "fascists from Munkkiniemi" used dynamite and IEDs built from anti-aircraft shells to blow up the headquarters of Vapaa Sana newspaper.

During the Cold War, far-right activism was limited to small illegal groups such as the Turku Society for the Spiritual Sciences, led by Pekka Siitoin who made headlines after arson and bombing of the printing houses of the Communist Party of Finland. His associates also sent letter bombs to leftists, including to the headquarters of the Finnish Democratic Youth League. Another group called the "New Patriotic People's Movement" bombed the left-wing Kansan Uutiset newspaper and the embassy of communist Bulgaria. Member of the Nordic Realm Party Seppo Seluska was convicted of the torture and murder of a gay Jew.

In 1975 in Petäjävesi an election campaign event of the communist SKDL was bombed by self-declared neo-fascists. There were no deaths although the bomb caused material damages. In November 1978, the office of the Southern Saimaa Union of Socialist Youth was destroyed in an arson attack. The perpetrators left behind a swastika painted on the wall.

The skinhead culture gained momentum during the late 1980s and peaked during the late 1990s. In 1991, Finland received a number of Somali immigrants who became the main target of Finnish skinhead violence in the following years, including four attacks using explosives and a racist murder. Asylum seeker centres were attacked, in Joensuu skinheads would force their way into an asylum seeker centre and start shooting with shotguns. At worst Somalis were assaulted by 50 skinheads at the same time.

The most prominent neo-Nazi group Nordic Resistance Movement that is tied to multiple murders, attempted murders and assaults of political enemies was found in 2006 and proscribed in 2019. During the European migrant crisis 40 asylum seeker reception centres were targets of arson attacks. In its annual threat assessment for 2020, the National Bureau of Investigation found that despite the ban, the threat of far-right terrorism had risen and identified 400 persons of interest "motivated and with the capacity to perform terrorism in Finland". International links and funding networks were pointed out as a special source of concern.

On 4 December 2021, the Finnish police arrested a five-man cell in Kankaanpää on suspicion of planning a terror attack and confiscated numerous firearms including assault rifles and forty kilos of explosives and hundreds of litres of explosive precursors. According to the Finnish media the men adhered to the ideology of Atomwaffen and James Mason and used Atomwaffen-like symbols.

In July 2022, a group of youth stole all the rainbow flags from a library in Lapua and left an improvised explosive device behind. There were no casualties but a gay pride event was interrupted by the explosion. On 26 August 2022 a bomb exploded near a pride in Savonlinna, the police has arrested two locals for the act. In July 2023 the Finnish police arrested five men in Lahti who possessed assault rifles and adhered to accelerationism and Siege and planned to ignite a race war by attacking the infrastructure, electric grid and railroads. A man affiliated with the Lahti group is also suspected of plotting a ritual murder and sending a string of letter bombs sent to Social Democrat, Green and Left party offices.

In mid-June 2024, there was a series of racist stabbings in Oulu. One of the perpetrators was on the terror watchlist for connections to the outlawed terror group Nordic Resistance Movement. Another perpetrator was a supporter of the NRM as well. The third attacker was unaffiliated. The three men stabbed several people with a perceived immigrant background, causing life-threatening injuries.

=== France ===
France has a modern history of right-wing terrorism that dates back to the middle of the 20th century. Historically, right-wing terrorism was tied to rage over the loss of France's colonial possessions in Africa, particularly, the loss of Algeria. In 1961, the Organisation armée secrète or OAS, a right-wing terrorist group that protested against Algerian independence from France, launched a bomb attack on board a Strasbourg–Paris train which killed 28 people.

On 14 December 1973, the far-right Charles Martel Group orchestrated a bomb attack at the Consulate of Algeria, killing 4 people and injuring 20.

In the town of Toulon, a far-right extremist group called SOS-France existed. On 18 August 1986, four members were driving a car carrying explosives, apparently in an attempt to bomb the offices of SOS Racisme. However it exploded while they were still in it, killing all four of them.

In more recent times, far-right extremism in France has been fueled by the rise of anti-immigrant and far-right political movements. Neo-Nazi members of the French and European Nationalist Party were responsible for a pair of anti-immigrant terror bombings in 1988. Sonacotra hostels in Cagnes-sur-Mer and Cannes were bombed, killing Romanian immigrant George Iordachescu and injuring 16 people, mostly Tunisians. In an attempt to frame Jewish extremists for the Cagnes-sur-Mer bombing, the terrorists left leaflets bearing Stars of David and the name Masada at the scene, with the message "To destroy Israel, Islam has chosen the sword. For this choice, Islam will perish."

On 28 May 2008, members of the neo-Nazi Nomad 88 group fired machine guns at people from their car in Saint-Michel-sur-Orge.

In the aftermath of the Charlie Hebdo shooting, six mosques and a restaurant were attacked, the attacks were classified as acts of right-wing terrorism by the authorities.

=== Germany ===
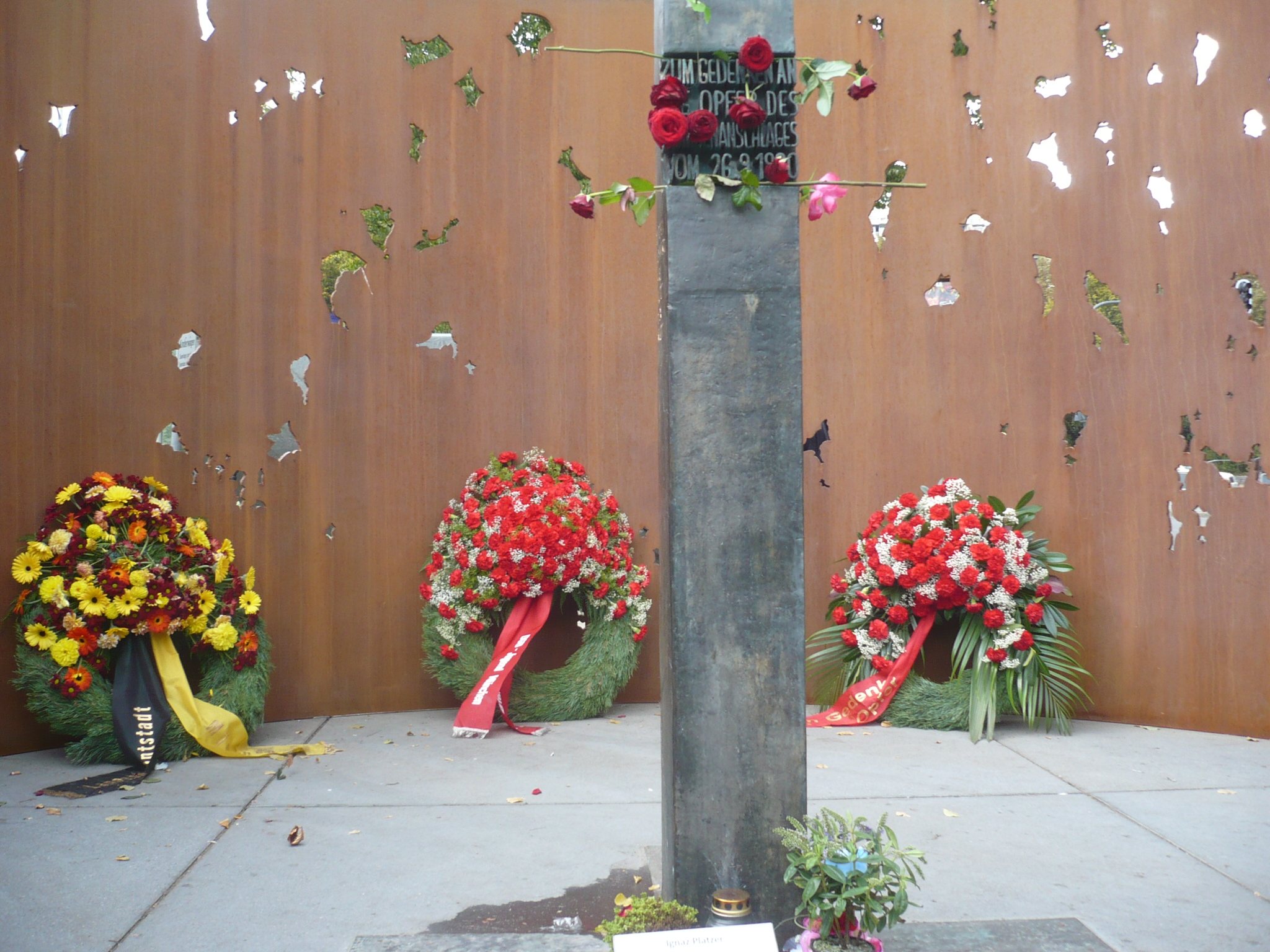
Memorial commemorating victims of the Oktoberfest bombing

In 1980, a right-wing terrorist attack, known as Oktoberfest bombing in Munich, Germany, killed 13 people, including the attacker, and injured 215. Fears of an ongoing campaign of major right-wing terrorist attacks did not materialize.

Right-wing extremist offenses in Germany rose sharply in 2015 and 2016. Figures from the German government tallied 316 violent xenophobic offences in 2014 and 612 such offenses in 2015.

In August 2014, a group of four Germans founded a Munich-based far-right terrorist group, the Oldschool Society. The group, which held racist, antisemitic, and anti-Muslim views, eventually attracted 30 members. They stockpiled weapons and explosives and plotted to attack a refugee shelter in Saxony, but the group's leaders were arrested in May 2015 before carrying out the attack. In March 2017 four of the group's leaders were sentenced to prison terms.

The perpetrator of a mass shooting in Munich in 2016 had far-right views.

According to figures which were released by the interior ministry in May 2019, of an estimated 24,000 far-right extremists in the country, 12,700 Germans are inclined towards violence. Extremists belonging to Der Dritte Weg/The III. Path marched in through a town in Saxony on 1 May, the day before the Jewish remembrance of the Holocaust, carrying flags and a banner saying "Social justice instead of criminal foreigners".

Walter Lübcke, a Christian Democratic Union (CDU) politician from Hesse was assassinated at his home via gunshot because of his pro-migrant views by Stephan Ernst, a German Neo-Nazi who was a member of the British neo-Nazi terrorist group Combat 18 (C18) and the National Democratic Party of Germany (NPD) who had engaged in a series of anti-migrant crimes and had been convicted for knife and bomb attacks against minorities. Following the murder, the self-described "doomsday prepper" group Nordkreuz (German: Northern Cross) was discovered to have made kill lists of politicians and acquired body bags for a hypothetical "Day X" doomsday scenario; using the messaging app Telegram and a police database with 25,000 names, the group amassed firearms and ammunition.

On 19 February 2020, two mass shootings occurred at two shisha bars in Hanau, resulting in the death of nine people, all with an immigrant background. The attacker then killed his mother at their house and committed suicide. The 43-year-old attacker was identified as a far-right extremist, who expressed a hatred for immigrants.

In February 2020, following the observation of a meeting of a dozen right-wing extremists, those involved were arrested after they had decided to launch attacks on mosques in Germany to trigger a civil war.

=== Italy ===
In the 1970s and 1980s, Italy endured the Years of Lead, a period of time in which terrorist attacks were frequently perpetrated: between 1969 and 1982, the nation suffered 8,800 terrorist attacks, in which a total of 351 people were killed and 768 were injured. The terrorist attacks have been both ascribed both to the far-left and the far-right, yet many of the terrorist attacks remain without a clear culprit; many have claimed that responsibility for the attacks could be ascribed to rogue members of the Italian secret service. Some of the terrorist attacks ascribed to a particular political group may have actually been the work of these rogue agents: this has been claimed, among many others, by Francesco Cossiga, who was the Prime Minister during the last years of lead, and by Giulio Andreotti, who, during the same period of time, held the office of Prime Minister more than once.

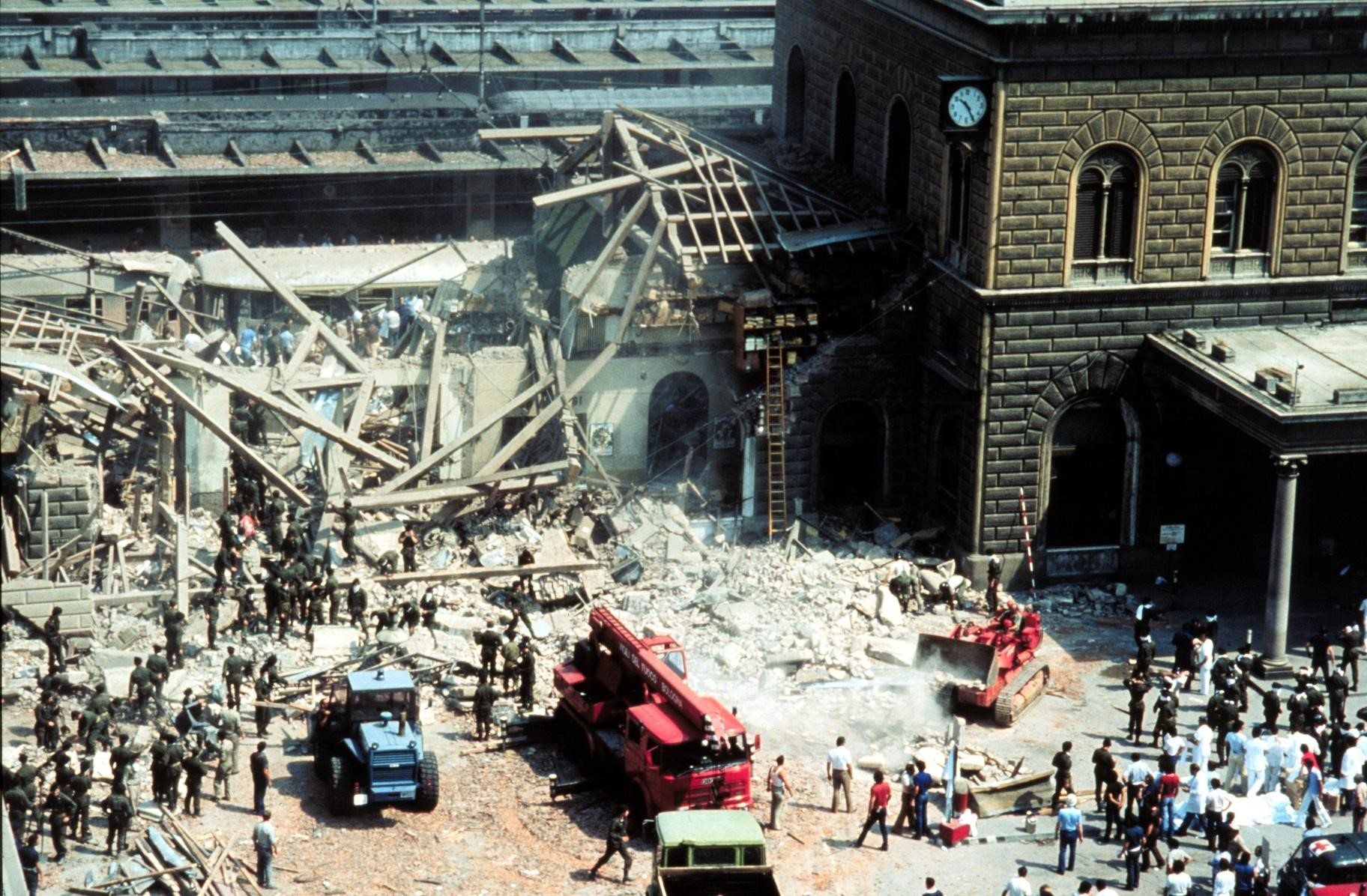
Ruins of the Bologna station west wing after the 1980 Bologna Massacre

The Years of Lead are considered to have begun with the Piazza Fontana bombing in Milan in December 1969, perpetrated by Ordine Nuovo, a right-wing neofascist group. Sixteen people were killed, and 90 injured, in the bombing.

In July 1970, this same group carried out a bombing on a train traveling from Rome to Messina, killing six and wounding almost 100. The group also carried out the Piazza della Loggia bombing in 1974, killing eight antifascist activists. Perhaps the most infamous right-wing terrorist attack in post-war Italy is the August 1980 Bologna bombing, in which neo-fascist Nuclei Armati Rivoluzionari ('Armed Revolutionary Nuclei'), an Ordine Nuovo offshoot, killed 85 people and injured 200 at the Bologna railroad station. Valerio Fioravanti, Francesca Mambro, and two others were convicted of mass murder in the attacks, although both have always denied any connection with them.

In December 2011, Gianluca Casseri targeted Senegalese peddlers in Florence, killing two and injuring three others before killing himself. The perpetrator was a sympathizer of CasaPound, a neo-fascist party that Italian judges have recognized as not posing a threat to public or private safety.

=== Latvia ===
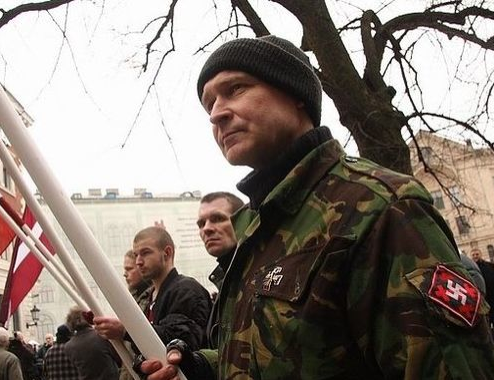
Igors Šiškins at the Remembrance day of the Latvian legionnaires on March 16, 2009

On the night of 5 June 1997, members of the far-right Pērkonkrusts unsuccessfully bombed the Monument to the Liberators of Soviet Latvia and Riga from the German Fascist Invaders. Two of them were killed in the explosion, while six others, including Igors Šiškins, were sentenced for up to three years in prison in 2000. The group ceased organised activities or was banned around 2006.

In late 2018, the State Security Service arrested a self-proclaimed follower of the ideas of Anders Behring Breivik who was planning to perform terrorist attacks on an ethnic minority school and several commercial outlets in Jūrmala on 13 February, the birthday of Breivik. The individual had previously published comments on different websites for an extended period of time aimed against the Roma and Russian people, including calls to exterminate them. He was found guilty but exempted from criminal liability on medical grounds and assigned to a psychiatric hospital for treatment.

=== Norway ===
On 22 July 2011, Norwegian right-wing extremist with neo-Nazi and fascist sympathies Anders Behring Breivik carried out the 2011 Norway attacks, the deadliest attack in Norway since World War II. First, he bombed several government buildings in Oslo, killing eight people and injuring more than 200. After the bombings, he went to Utøya island in a fake police uniform and began firing on people attending a political youth camp for the Worker's Youth League (AUF), a left-wing political party, killing 69 and injuring more than 110. Overall, the two terrorist attacks in Utøya and Oslo, Norway resulted in 77 dead and 319 injured. Anders Behring Breivik also had written a manifesto 2083: A European Declaration of Independence in which he accused Islam, Cultural Marxism, multiculturalism, and feminism of causing a "cultural suicide" of Europe and claimed to belong to an organization called the Knights' Templar (named after the medieval military order).

Philip Manshaus was arrested for attacking Al-Noor Islamic Centre in Baerum, on the outskirts of Oslo, on August 10, 2019. According to police, the man appeared to hold "far-right" and "anti-immigrant" views and had expressed sympathy for Vidkun Quisling – the fascist World War II leader of Norway – as well as Australian-born terrorist Brenton Harrison Tarrant, the perpetrator of the Christchurch, New Zealand mosque shootings, John T. Earnest the perpetrator of the Escondido, California mosque fire and the Poway, California synagogue shooting, as well as Patrick Crusius the man behind the El Paso, Texas Walmart shooting targeting Mexicans. He has been charged with attempted murder in this case and with the murder of his 17-year-old stepsister in an unrelated incident. The mosque shooting is being investigated as a possible act of terrorism.

=== Russia ===
The Savior was a Russian neo-Nazi militant nationalist organization which claimed credit for the August 2006 Moscow market bombing, which killed 13. Media reports indicate that the market, located near Cherkizovsky, was targeted due to its high volume of Central Asian and Caucasian clientele. The Russian Imperial Movement is a Russian ultranationalist, white supremacist, far-right paramilitary organization based in Saint Petersburg. It has been designated as a terrorist group by the United States and Canada.

Russian separatist forces in Donbas include several right-wing militias, connected to the official armed forces of the right-wing breakaway Donetsk People's Republic and Luhansk People's Republic in eastern Ukraine, which are designed terrorist organisations by the Ukrainian government. International volunteers for the militias have been arrested for plotting terror attacks.

According to The Daily Telegraph, Russian state militarization of the youth and narratives of external threats have been responsible for youth violence and school attacks against perceived outsiders. There were at least seven school attacks in the first two months of 2026, like the Bashkir State Medical University attack in which a teen neo-Nazi stabbed seven foreign students while shouting Nazi slogans and painting a swastika with the victims' blood. There is also a convergence with militants fighting in Ukraine, the neo-Nazi paramilitary Rusich group supported the 15-year-old white supremacist who stabbed a Tajik student to death in the 2025 Odintsovo school attack.

=== Spain ===
Far-right terrorist acts surged after the death of dictator Francisco Franco in 1975 and continued until the early 1980s, ranging from assassination of individuals to mass murder.

=== Sweden ===
Both the 2009–10 Malmö shootings and the Trollhättan school stabbing were conducted by right-wing terrorists along with a refugee centre bombing in 2017. A notable serial killer motivated by far-right motives is John Ausonius.

=== Slovakia ===
On October 12, 2022, two people were killed and another was injured after a right-wing terrorist opened fire against an LGBT venue in Bratislava.

=== Turkey ===
The neo-fascist and ultranationalist Grey Wolves have been involved in terrorist attacks in which they have targeted members of left-wing groups and ethnic minorities. The group is notable because its death squads perpetrated terrorist attacks during the political violence of the late 1970s, such as the Taksim Square massacre in 1977 (killings of leftists) or the Bahçelievler massacre in 1978 when seven students who were members of a socialist party were assassinated.

=== United Kingdom ===
Between 2007 and 2022, seventy people who were associated with the far-right have been convicted of more than two hundred terrorist offences, based on eight different offences from the Terrorism Act 2000 and 2006.

In 2013, the UK government assessed that right-wing extremism was a "very low risk to national security"; this changed the following year after the emergence of the neo-Nazi group National Action. Since 2014, there has been a significant increase in the threat from extreme right-wing terrorism (ERWT) in the UK, referring to "the segment of the far-right movement involved in politically motivated violence". In response, experts in security and intelligence have increased monitoring of threats from groups and individuals which hold extreme right-wing views. Counter Terrorism Policing reported that between March 2017 and December 2021, 12 of 32 imminent terrorism plots that were thwarted were ERWT. The Independent Reviewer of Terrorism Legislation reported in 2022 that one in five counter-terrorism investigations and 40% of terrorism-related arrests were related to far-right perspectives. As of 2025, ERWT includes cultural nationalism, white nationalism and white supremacist ideologies.

In the UK, the history of ERWT can be traced back to the activism of Sir Oswald Mosley’s British Union of Fascists, an ultranationalist group that was subsequently banned in 1940. In Studies in Conflict & Terrorism, Jupp wrote that "Politically motivated violence and terrorism have been persistent features of this movement, which comprises a complex assortment of political parties, street movements, extremist organizations and atomized lone actors advocating a diverse range of ideologies and narratives." This includes individuals associated with the National Front and British National Party, with David Copeland's London bombings serving as a notable example.

On 16 June 2016, member of parliament, Jo Cox, was murdered by a 53-year-old white nationalist who had links to British and American far-right political groups including the NF, the U.S. neo-Nazi organisation National Alliance, and the EDL.

On 19 June 2017, a 47-year-old man used a van to attack Muslim worshippers at Finsbury Park mosque, killing 1 and injuring 11.

==== Northern Ireland ====
Loyalist paramilitaries such as the Ulster Volunteer Force (UVF), Ulster Defence Association (UDA), Loyalist Volunteer Force (LVF) and Orange Volunteer Force (OVF) have been aligned with far-right politics and ideology and have been involved in numerous sectarian attacks and killings on Catholics both during and after the Troubles. During the conflict, British far-right activists supplied funds and weaponry to these groups in Northern Ireland. Following the Good Friday Agreement, some members of Loyalist groups orchestrated racist attacks in Northern Ireland, including pipe bomb and gun attacks on the homes of immigrants. As a result, Northern Ireland has a higher proportion of racist attacks than other parts of the UK, and was branded the "race-hate capital of Europe".

== Oceania ==
=== Australia ===
In August 2016, Phillip Galea was charged with several terrorist offences. Galea had conducted "surveillance" of "left-wing premises" and planned to carry out bombings. Explosive ingredients were found at his home. Galea had links with organisations such as Combat 18 (C18) and the United Patriots Front (UPF). On 5 December 2019, a jury found Galea guilty of planning and preparing a terror attack.

In 2017, the Sydney Morning Herald reported on the conviction of neo-Nazi Michael James Holt, 26 who had threatened to carry out a mass shooting attack and considered Westfield Tuggerah as a target. He had manufactured home-made guns, knuckle dusters and slingshots in his grandfather's garage. Raids on his mother's home and a hotel room discovered more weapons including several firearms, slingshots and knuckle dusters.

== Asia ==
=== India ===
In 1992, the 16th-century Babri Masjid in the city of Ayodhya, in Uttar Pradesh was demolished by the Vishva Hindu Parishad, a far-right Hindutva organisation. According to them, the mosque was built on the site of a Hindu temple in the 19th century. The demolition resulted in intercommunal rioting between India's Hindu and Muslim communities, causing the deaths of at least 2,000 people.

=== Israel ===
A number of right-wing Revisionist Zionist groups have been designated as terrorist organisations. Lehi, known as the Stern Gang, was a Zionist paramilitary and terrorist organization founded in Mandatory Palestine in 1940, professing National Bolshevism and influenced by Italian fascism. It carried out assassinations and it was also accused of committing massacres until it was disbanded in 1949. The Jewish Underground was a radical right-wing organization which was considered a terrorist organization by the Israeli government. It plotted and carried out car and bus bombings, and it also plotted and carried out attacks on students and religious sites in the early 1980s until the arrest of its main activists in 1984. Kach and its splinter group Kahane Chai was a right-wing Orthodox Jewish, ultranationalist political party in Israel, which was formed in 1971 and was designated as a terrorist organization by Israel in the 1990s, Canada, the European Union, Japan, and the United States.

== See also ==
- Far-right politics
- Nationalist terrorism
- Political violence

== Bibliography ==
- Atkins, Stephen E. (2004). Encyclopedia of Modern Worldwide Extremists and Extremist Groups. Greenwood Publishing Group. ISBN 978-0-313-32485-7.
- Aubrey, Stefan M. (2004). The New Dimension of International Terrorism. vdf Hochschulverlag AG. ISBN 978-3-7281-2949-9.
- Brittain, James J. (2010). Revolutionary Social Change in Colombia: The Origin and Direction of the FARC-EP. Introduction by James F. Petras. Pluto Press. ISBN 978-0-7453-2876-8.
- Goldwag, Arthur (2012). The New Hate: A History of Fear and Loathing on the Populist Right. Pantheon Books. OCLC 724650284
- Jones, Mark; Johnstone, Peter (11 July 2011). History of Criminal Justice. Routledge. ISBN 978-1-4377-3497-3.
- Livingstone, Grace (2003). Inside Colombia: Drugs, Democracy and War. Rutgers University Press. ISBN 978-0-8135-3443-5.
- Mahan, Sue; Griset, Pamala L. (2008). Terrorism in Perspective. SAGE. ISBN 978-1-4129-5015-2.
- Marks, Kathy (1996). Faces of Right Wing Extremism. Branden Publishing Company. ISBN 978-0-8283-2016-0.
- Martin, Gus (17 January 2012). Understanding Terrorism: Challenges, Perspectives, and Issues. SAGE Publications. ISBN 978-1-4522-0582-3.
- Michael, George (2 September 2003). Confronting Right Wing Extremism and Terrorism in the USA. Routledge. ISBN 978-1-134-37761-9.
- Michael, George. 2010. The Enemy of My Enemy: The Alarming Convergence of Militant Islam and the Extreme Right. University Press of Kansas. ISBN 0-700-61444-3. OCLC 62593627
- Moghadam, Assaf; Eubank, William Lee (2006). The Roots of Terrorism. Infobase Publishing. ISBN 978-0-7910-8307-9.
- Smith, Brent L. (25 January 1994). Terrorism in America: Pipe Bombs and Pipe Dreams. SUNY Press. ISBN 978-0-7914-1760-7.
