= Victory Park (Riga) =

Park in Riga, Latvia

Coordinates: 56.939°N 24.085°E

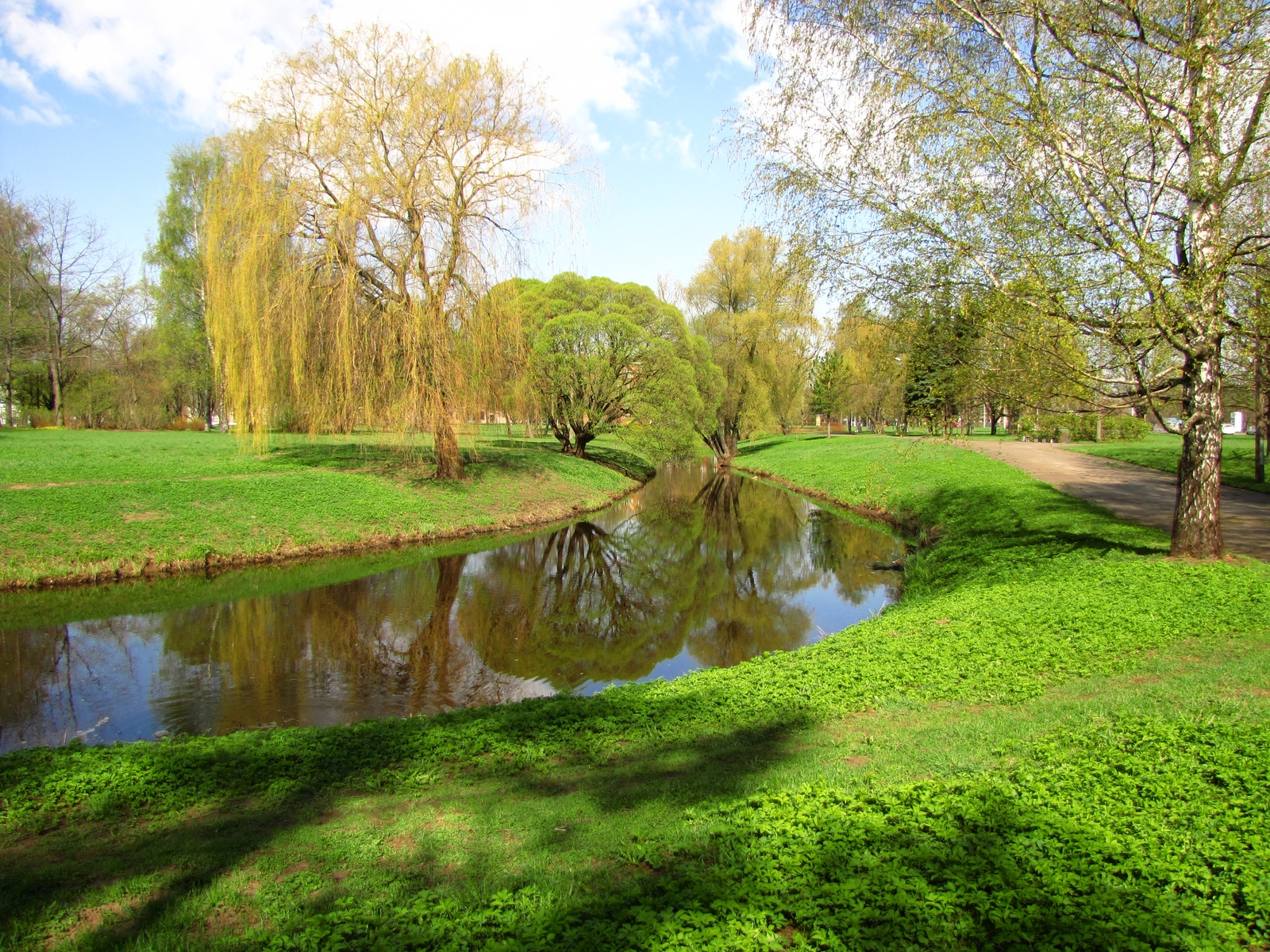
- Victory Park in spring
- Interactive map of Victory Park
- Type: Memorial
- Location: Riga, Latvia
- Created: 1909
- Opened: 1910
- Etymology: Victory over the West Russian Volunteer Army during the Latvian War of Independence
- Status: All year

Victory Park (Latvian: Uzvaras parks) is a park in Riga, located on the left bank of the Daugava, in the district of Āgenskalns. The modern area of the park is 36.7 hectares.

== History ==
The park was created in 1909 and named Petrovsky Park (Russian: Петровский парк, Latvian: Pētera parks) after Tsar Peter I to mark the bicentenary since the capitulation of Estonia and Livonia. The official opening ceremony of the park complex took place in the middle of 1910 in the presence of Tsar Nicholas II, and the Mayor of Riga George Armitstead.

In 1923, the park was renamed Victory Park in honor of the Latvian victory in 1919 over the West Russian Volunteer Army under the command of Colonel Pavel Bermondt-Avalov during the Latvian War of Independence. In 1930, a reconstruction of the park was carried out, aimed at creating a new socially significant leisure center for the population of the Latvian capital. In 1938, the 9th Latvian Song Festival was held in a temporary grandstand in the park.

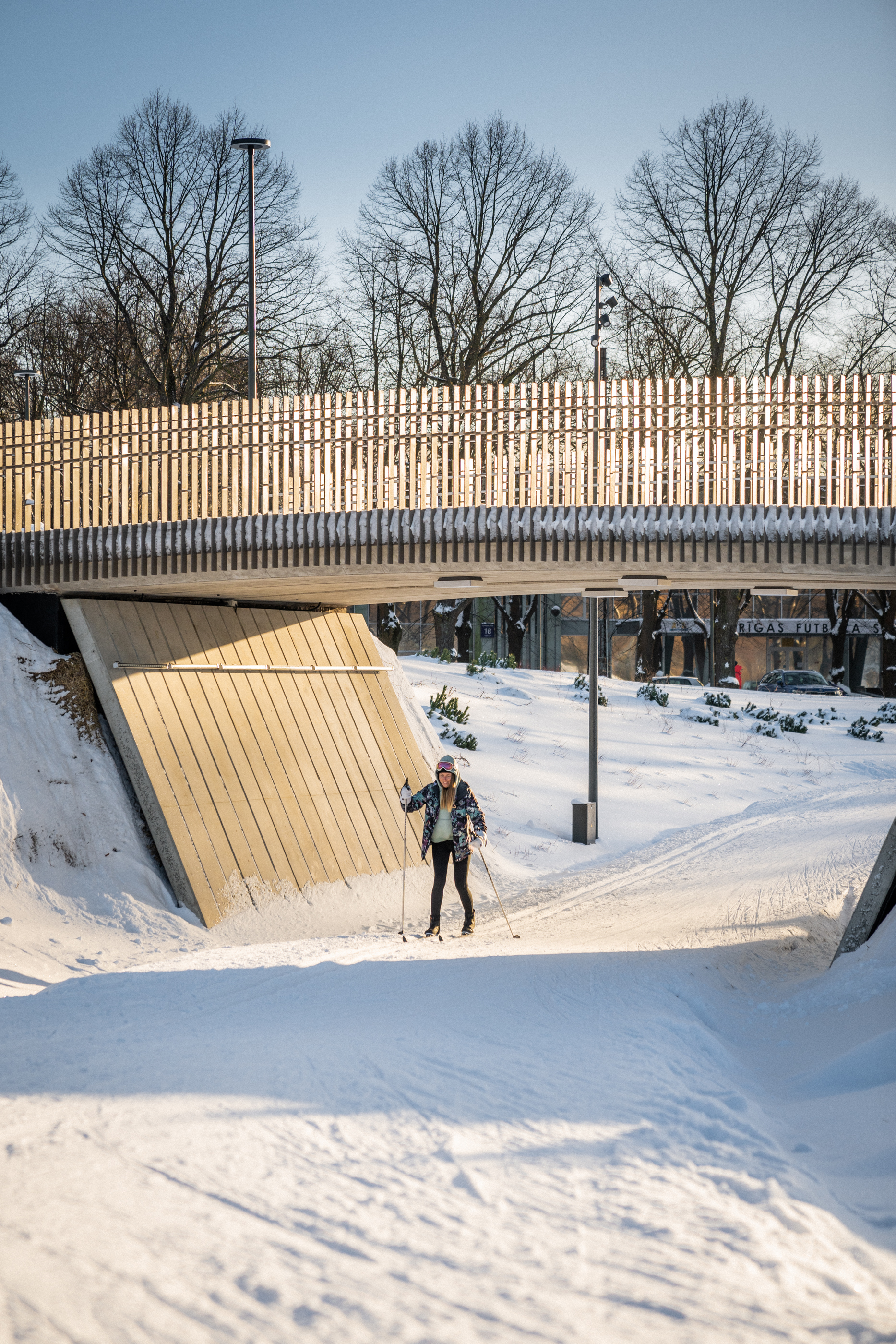
The park offers a cross-county skiing track in winter

A grand renovation plan, proposed in 1938–1939 during a contest organized during the dictatorship of Kārlis Ulmanis by architects Frīdrihs Skujiņš and Georgs Dauge, envisioned a wide 'Alley of Victory' and a torchlight-crowned, 60-meter-tall 'Victory Tower'; a mass event and parade ground with stands and a permanent grandstand for the Song Festival; a velodrome; sports hall with a capacity of 10,000; a stadium and a new harbour in Āgenskalns Bay. Despite receiving around 3 million Ls in donations, the works did not commence due to the start of World War II.

After the Soviet re-occupation, the Riga City Council renamed the park after the 1961 22nd Congress of the Communist Party of the Soviet Union. In 1985, the Monument to the Liberators of Soviet Latvia and Riga from the German Fascist Invaders was opened, and the park was renamed to Victory Park again, this time reinterpreting the name as the Soviet victory over Nazi Germany in World War II.

Following the 2022 Russian invasion of Ukraine, the monument was removed on 22–25 August. After the first stage of redevelopment, the park was reopened for the public on Lāčplēsis Day in 2023. Following a public resident survey, the second stage of redevelopment began with the construction of an active recreation zone.
