= Aizsargi =

Latvian voluntary militia

Aizsargi Latvijas Aizsargu organizācija
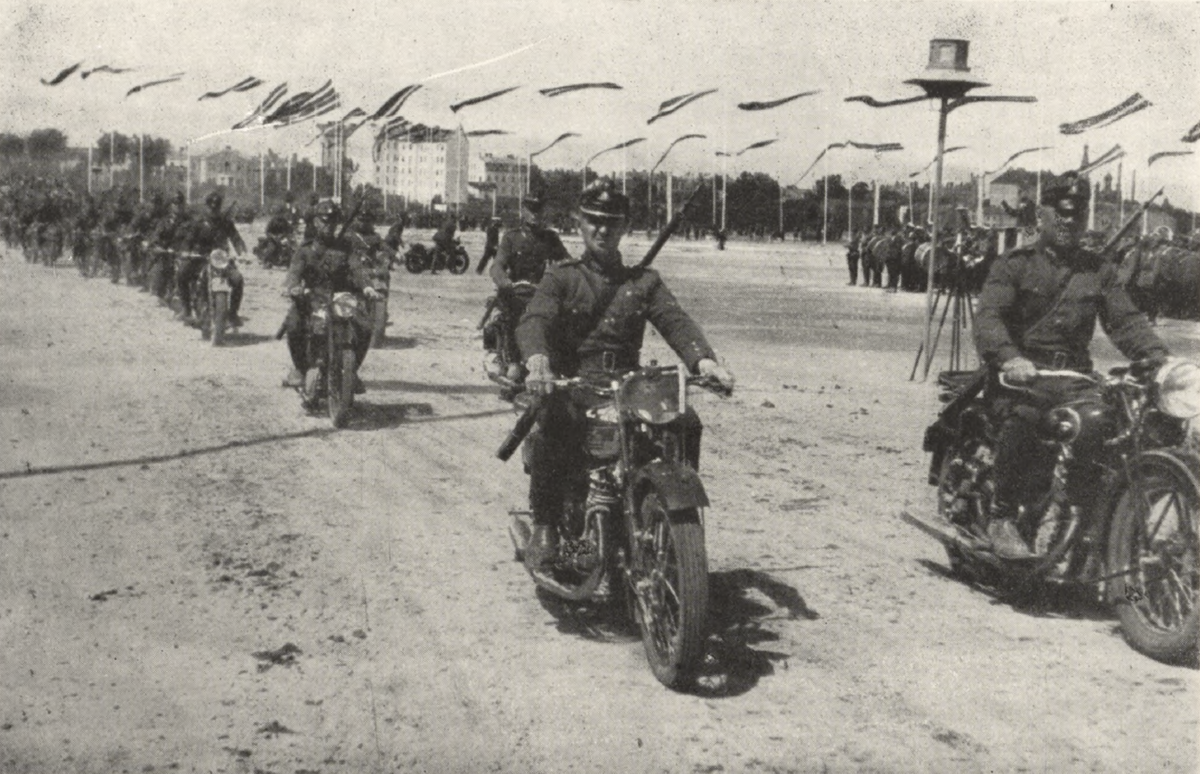
- Aizsargu motorcyclists during a 20-year anniversary in 1939.
- Active: 1919–1940
- Country: Latvia
- Type: Infantry
- Size: 60,684 (1940)
- Motto: Visu par Latviju (Everything for Latvia)
- Engagements: Latvian War of Independence; 1934 Latvian coup d'état

Commanders
- Notable commanders: Ludvigs Bolšteins; Augusts Tons; Kārlis Prauls

Insignia
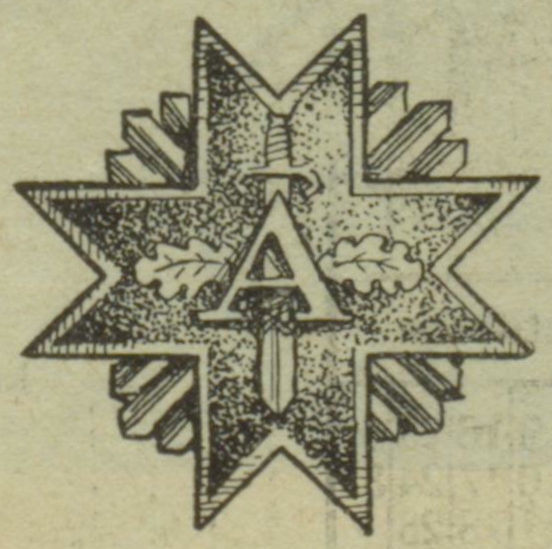
- Identification symbol

Aizsargi (lit. 'Defenders' or 'Guards'; officially – Latvian: Latvijas Aizsargu organizācija, lit. 'Guards Organization of Latvia', or LAO) was a volunteer paramilitary organization, militia with some characteristics of a military reserve force in Latvia during the interbellum period (1918–1939).

The Aizsargi was created on March 30, 1919, by the Latvian Provisional Government as a self-defense force - a kind of National Guard - during the Latvian War of Independence. In 1921, it was reorganized to follow the example of the Finnish Suojeluskunta (known as the "White Guard").

The Aizsargi published a newspaper, entitled Aizsargs ("Defender"/"Guard"), and the movement had subsidiary sections for women ("Aizsardzes", established in 1926) and youth ("Jaunsargi").

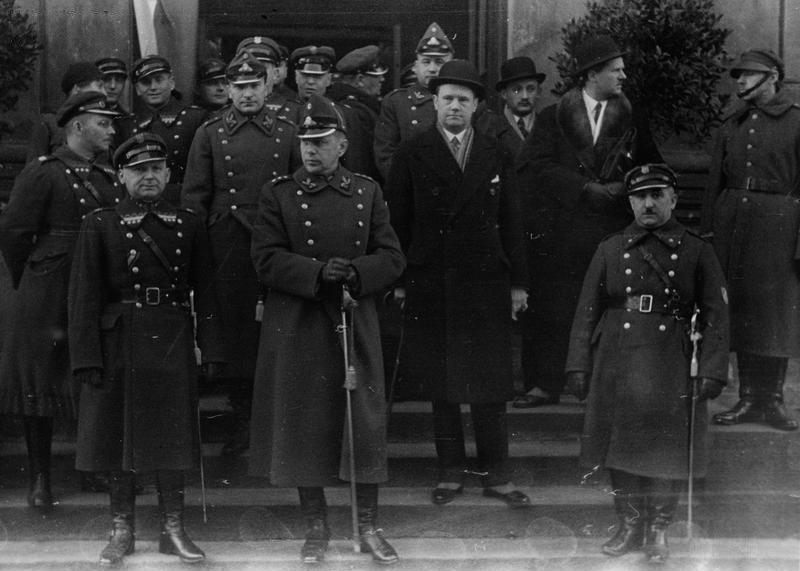
A delegation of Aizsargi officers in Warsaw, 1933. The distinctive oak-leaf pattern collar patches and headgear of the Aizsargi uniform can be seen here.

The organization, along with the Latvian Army, provided military support to the 1934 coup d'état of Kārlis Ulmanis.

By 1 January 1940, the organization had a membership of 60,684: 31,874 guards (aizsargi), 14,810 women members (aizsardzes), and 14,000 youth members (jaunsargi). The organization consisted of 19 infantry regiments and the separate Railroad and Aviation Regiments.

On 23 June 1940, the organization was disbanded as a result of the Soviet occupation of Latvia in 1940. During the Soviet occupation, the former members of the LAO were heavily persecuted.

== Post-independence status ==
After the restoration of the independence of Latvia, the Aizsargi organization was not re-established by the government, as the Latvian National Guard was formed in 1991 as the main volunteer defence force of the country. Since then, separate small-scale NGOs have claimed to be the successors of the original LAO, which sometimes espoused fringe right-wing political views, e.g. the LAO group led by Riga Film Studio make-up artist Jānis Rība who was assassinated in 1997, possibly by Pērkonkrusts members; the Latvijas Aizsargi ('Aizsargi of Latvia') and others.
