= Ugunskrusts =

The swastika as a symbol in Latvian folklore

Ugunskrusts (Fire Cross).

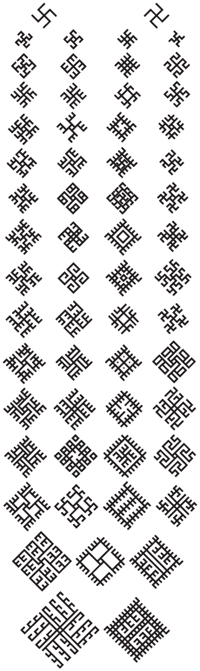
Ugunskrusts variants.

Ugunskrusts (Latvian for 'fire cross', 'cross of fire'; other names — pērkonkrusts ('cross of thunder', 'thunder cross), cross of Perkūnas, cross of branches, Cross of Laima) is the swastika as a symbol in Latvian folklore.

The swastika is an ancient Baltic thunder cross symbol (pērkona krusts; also fire cross, ugunskrusts), used to decorate objects, traditional clothing and in archaeological excavations. Latvia adopted the swastika, for its Air Force in 1918/1919 and continued its use until the Soviet occupation in 1940. The cross itself was maroon on a white background, mirroring the colors of the Latvian flag. Earlier versions pointed counter-clockwise, while later versions pointed clock-wise and eliminated the white background. Various other Latvian Army units and the Latvian War College (the predecessor of the National Defence Academy) also had adopted the symbol in their battle flags and insignia during the Latvian War of Independence.

A stylised fire cross is the base of the Order of Lāčplēsis, the highest military decoration of Latvia for participants of the War of Independence. The Pērkonkrusts, an ultra-nationalist political organisation active in the 1930s and its successors in the 1990s–2010s, also used the fire cross as one of its symbols.

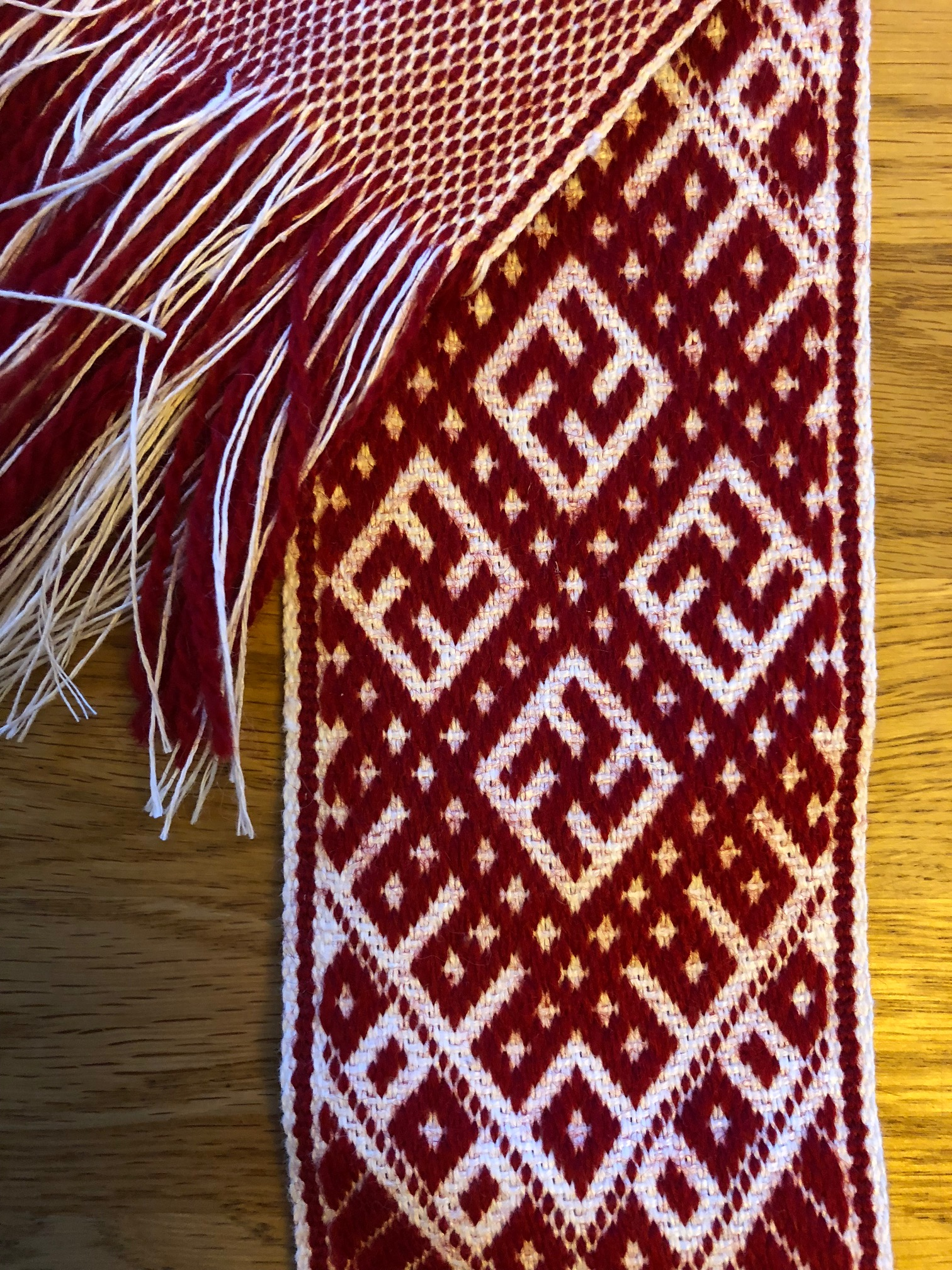
The 'Laima Cross' on the Lielvārde Belt

Latvian Air Force roundel until 1940

Coat of arms of Stāmeriena Parish

Coat of arms of Stradi Parish

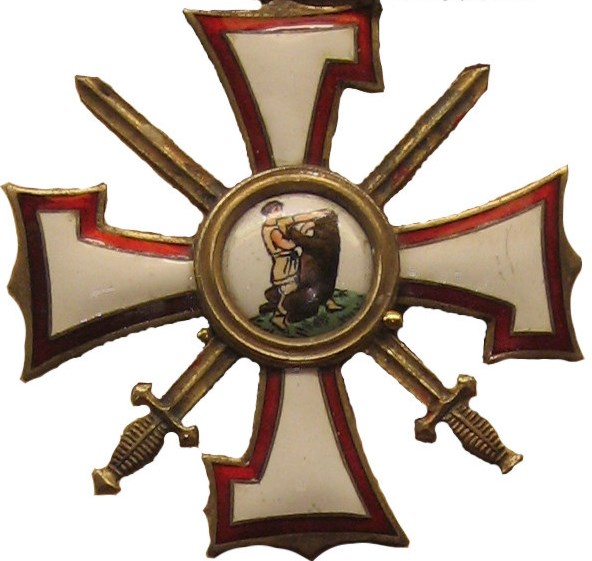
The cross of the Order of Lāčplēsis

Flag of the Pērkonkrusts
