= Gustavs Celmiņš =

Latvian politician (1899–1968)

- Born: Gustavs Celmiņš; April 1, 1899; Riga, Russian Empire
- Died: April 10, 1968 (aged 69); San Antonio, Texas, United States
- Occupations: Politician, activist, dissident
- Years active: 1918–1968

Gustavs Celmiņš (April 1, 1899 – April 10, 1968) was a Latvian politician, who was the founder of the ultranationalist, Anti-Baltic German, anti-Slavic, and antisemitic political party Pērkonkrusts.

== Biography ==
He was educated at the commerce school of the Riga Stock Exchange, and graduated in Moscow. In 1917, he began studies at the Riga Polytechnical Institute which had been evacuated to Moscow. After the October Revolution, he returned to Latvia.

In 1918, Celmiņš enlisted into the newly created Latvian Army, and was promoted to lieutenant the following year, and was then appointed Latvian military attaché in Poland. In 1921, he was awarded the Order of Lāčplēsis.

Retired from army in 1924, he worked in the Ministry of Foreign Affairs from 1925 to 1927. Celmiņš became the secretary of Minister of Foreign Affairs, and subsequently worked in the Finance Ministry. On 24 January 1932, the Latvian nationalist group Ugunskrusts was founded, and Gustavs Celmiņš was elected as its leader. After Ugunskrusts was banned, he founded the ultranationalistic organization Pērkonkrusts. Common for both organisations was that they advocated a national revolution for a radical re-organisation of society, politics, and the economy in Latvia. Following the 1934 Latvian coup d'état, Celmiņš was arrested and imprisoned for three years.

He was exiled from Latvia in 1937. Celmiņš moved to Italy, then Switzerland. While in Zürich, he was arrested and then banished from Switzerland. He later lived in Romania, where he had contacts with the Iron Guard, and then moved to Finland. In 1938, he became the leader of Pērkonkrusts' "foreign contacts office". After the Soviet Union invaded Finland, Celmiņš enrolled as a volunteer on the Finnish side. When the conflict ended, he moved to Nazi Germany.

In July 1941, after Operation Barbarossa, together with Nazi officials, Celmiņš returned to Latvia and briefly regained leadership of Pērkonkrusts. After the German occupation authorities banned Pērkonkrusts a month later, Celmiņš continued his outward collaboration with the Germans in the hopes that sizable Latvian military formations would be created. From February 1942, he headed the Committee for Organising Latvian Volunteers (Latvian: Latviešu brīvprātīgo organizācijas komiteja), the main function of which was the recruitment of Latvian men for the Latvian Auxiliary Police Battalions, known in German as Schutzmannschaften or simply Schuma. Aside from front-line combat duties, some of these battalions were also deployed in anti-partisan operations in Latvia and Belarus that included the massacres of rural Jews and other civilians. This situation was not what Celmiņš had hoped for, and so he began to sabotage the recruitment efforts. Because of this, he was later transferred to a job as a minor clerk within the occupation administration.

Pērkonkrusts members working within the SD apparatus in occupied Latvia would feed Celmiņš information, some of which he would include in his underground, anti-German publication Brīvā Latvija. This eventually led to Celmiņš and his associates being arrested by the Gestapo in 1944, with Celmiņš ending up imprisoned in Flossenbürg concentration camp.

In late April 1945, he was, together with other prominent concentration camp inmates, transferred to Tyrol where the SS left the prisoners behind. He was liberated by the Fifth U.S. Army on 5 May 1945.

After World War II, he lived in Italy, where he published the newspaper Brīvā Latvija. In 1947, he published the autobiographic book Eiropas krustceļos ("At the Crossroads of Europe").

In 1949, he emigrated to the United States. From 1950 to 1952 he was an instructor at Syracuse University's Armed Forces school in New York state, and beginning in 1951 he was also the director of the Foreign Language program for the US Air Force, and a television lecturer about the USSR and communism. From 1954 to 1956 he worked as a manufacturer in Mexico. Between 1956 and 1958 he was a librarian at Trinity University in San Antonio, Texas. In 1959 he became a professor of Russian studies at St. Mary's University in San Antonio, Texas. He died on April 10, 1968, in San Antonio, Texas.

== Quotes ==
In a Latvian Latvia the question of minorities will not exist. ... This means that once and for all we renounce unreservedly bourgeois-liberal prejudice on the national question, we renounce historical, humanistic, or other constraints in pursuit of our one true aim—the good of the Latvian nation. Our God, our belief, our life's meaning, our goal is the Latvian nation: whoever is against its welfare is our enemy. ...

We assume that the only place in the world where Latvians can settle is Latvia. Other peoples have their own countries. ...

In one word—in a Latvian Latvia there will only be Latvians.

— Gustavs Celmiņš, "A Latvian Latvia", p. 218

== See also ==
- Igors Šiškins

== Bibliography ==
- Celmiņš, Gustavs (1947). Eiropas krustceļos (in Latvian). Esslingen: Dzintarzeme. OCLC 4511464.
- Celmiņš, Gustavs (1995) [1933-09-17]. "A Latvian Latvia". In Roger Griffin (ed.). Fascism. Oxford Readers. Oxford: Oxford University Press. pp. 217–8. ISBN 0-19-289249-5. OCLC 31606309.
