= 1934 Latvian coup d'état =

Self-coup by Prime Minister Kārlis Ulmanis

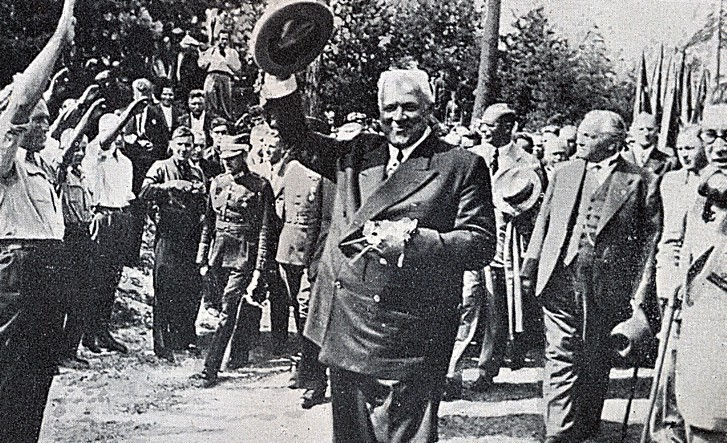
- Ulmanis, followed by ministers in 1934
Date	15‒16 May 1934
Location	Latvia
Result	Pro-Ulmanis victory: Coup d'état successful

Belligerents
Pro-Ulmanis Groups: Government of Latvia; Latvian Farmers' Union; Aizsargi	Anti-Ulmanis Groups: Saeima; Latvian Social Democratic Workers' Party; Pērkonkrusts

Commanders and leaders
Kārlis Ulmanis; Alberts Kviesis; Jānis Balodis	Pauls Kalniņš; Brūno Kalniņš; Gustavs Celmiņš

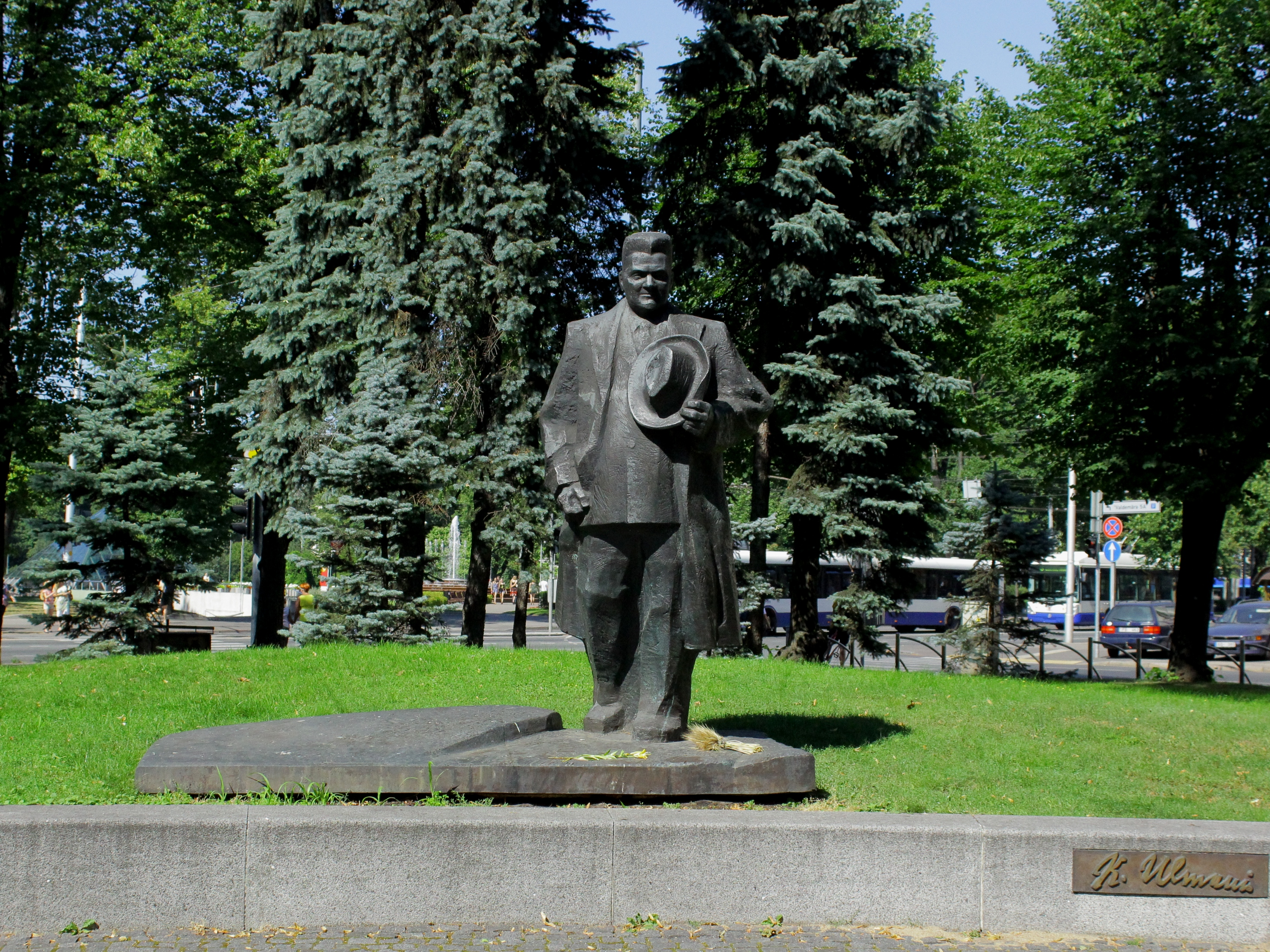
Monument to Ulmanis in Riga

The 1934 Latvian coup d'état (Latvian: 1934. gada 15. maija apvērsums) known in Latvia also as the 15 May Coup (15. maija apvērsums) or Ulmanis' Coup (Ulmaņa apvērsums), was a self-coup by the veteran Prime Minister Kārlis Ulmanis against the parliamentary system in Latvia. His regime lasted until the Soviet occupation of Latvia in 1940.

== Events ==
On the night of 15–16 May, Ulmanis, with the support of Minister of War Jānis Balodis and the paramilitary Aizsargi organization, took control of the main state and party offices, proclaimed a nationwide state of emergency (also referred to martial law), suspended the Constitution, dissolved all political parties and the Saeima (parliament).

Ulmanis then established a non-parliamentary authoritarian regime in which he continued as Prime Minister. Laws continued to be promulgated by the acting government. The incumbent President of Latvia Alberts Kviesis, who was from Ulmanis’ Latvian Farmers' Union, accepted the coup and served out the rest of his term until 10 April 1936. Ulmanis then illegally assumed the office of State President and was officially known as "President and Prime Minister" (Valsts un Ministru Prezidents), but usually in publications was called "Leader of the people" (Tautas Vadonis) or simply "Leader" (Vadonis).

Ulmanis was unique among European dictators of the time, as he did not create one ruling party and did not introduce a new constitution. Instead, Ulmanis created state-controlled Chambers of Professions, based on the corporatist models of the authoritarian regimes of Konstantin Päts in Estonia and António de Oliveira Salazar in Portugal. The regime was largely based on the authority and personality cults of Ulmanis and Balodis as founders of Latvia during the Independence who it was claimed had freed the nation from multi-party chaos.

The bloodless coup was carried out by the army and units of the national guard Aizsargi loyal to Ulmanis. They moved against key government offices, communications and transportation facilities. Many elected officials and politicians (almost exclusively from Latvian Social Democratic Workers' Party, as well as figures from the extreme right and left) were detained, as were any military officers that resisted the coup. Some 2,000 Social Democrats were initially detained by the authorities, including most of the Social Democratic members of the disbanded Saeima, as were members of various right-wing radical organisations, such as Pērkonkrusts. In all, 369 Social Democrats, 95 members of Pērkonkrusts, pro-Nazi activists from the Baltic German community, and a handful of politicians from other parties were interned in a prison camp established in the Karosta district of Liepāja. After several Social Democrats, such as Bruno Kalniņš, had been cleared of weapons charges by the courts, most of those imprisoned began to be released over time, some deciding to go into exile. Those convicted by the courts of treasonous acts, such as the leader of Pērkonkrusts Gustavs Celmiņš, remained behind bars for the duration of their sentences, three years in the case of Celmiņš.
