= Kārlis Prauls =

Latvian military officer

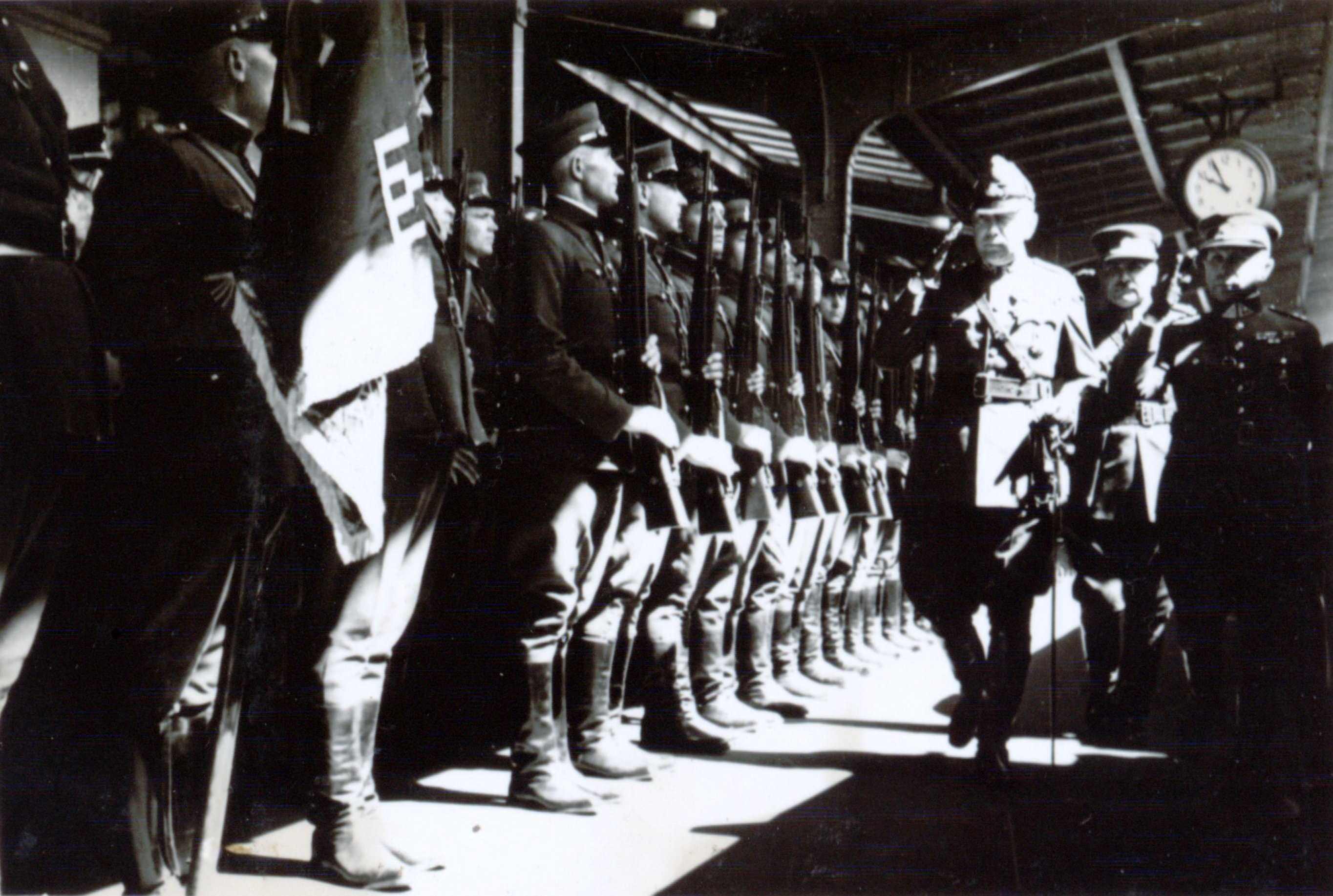
- Kārlis Prauls in Kaunas 1939 06 24
- Born: May 2, 1895; Lielstraupe parish, Russian Empire
- Died: January 30, 1941 (aged 45); Ulbroka, Latvian SSR
- Military career
- Allegiance: Russian Empire; Latvia
- Branch: Army
- Service years: 1915–1940
- Rank: General
- Conflicts: World War I Latvian War of Independence
- Other work: commander of Aizsargi organization

Kārlis Prauls (May 2, 1895 – January 30, 1941) was a Latvian general, and from 1930 to 1940 a commander in the Aizsargi home guard.

== Biography ==
Prauls was born in Lielstraupe parish in Vidzeme. In 1915, he volunteered for service in the Russian army, graduated from officer school, and subsequently served with the Latvian riflemen units.

When the Latvian War of Independence broke out, Prauls joined the Latvian army. After the war he remained in military service with the 3rd Jelgava's infantry regiment as battalion commander, later responsible for the regiment's logistics. In 1930 he was appointed to the post of commander in the Aizsargi home guard. In 1936, he completed officers' training and was promoted to the rank of colonel. He subsequently attended and graduated from Latvia's War School and in 1939 was appointed to the rank of general.

The Aizsargi were disbanded following the Soviet occupation of Latvia in 1940. Prauls was arrested on 19 September; sentenced to death on 20 December; and executed on 30 January 1941 in Ulbroka, outside Rīga. His remains were reinterred on 3 May 1994 at the Riga Forest Cemetery.
