= Brīvā Latvija (1943–44) =

Latvian newspaper

Brīvā Latvija. Latvju Raksti (Free Latvia. Latvian Writings) was the name of an underground, anti-German resistance newspaper in Nazi-occupied Latvia during World War II. Its first four issues appeared under the title Vēstījums (Message). The newspaper's editor and principal author was the Latvian fascist Gustavs Celmiņš. When the newspaper and its distribution networks were uncovered by the Gestapo, Celmiņš and others were arrested and sent to prison or concentration camps.
