= Monument to the Liberators of Soviet Latvia and Riga from the German Fascist Invaders =

Memorial in Riga, Latvia

- Piemineklis Padomju Latvijas un Rīgas atbrīvotājiem no vācu fašistiskajiem iebrucējiem
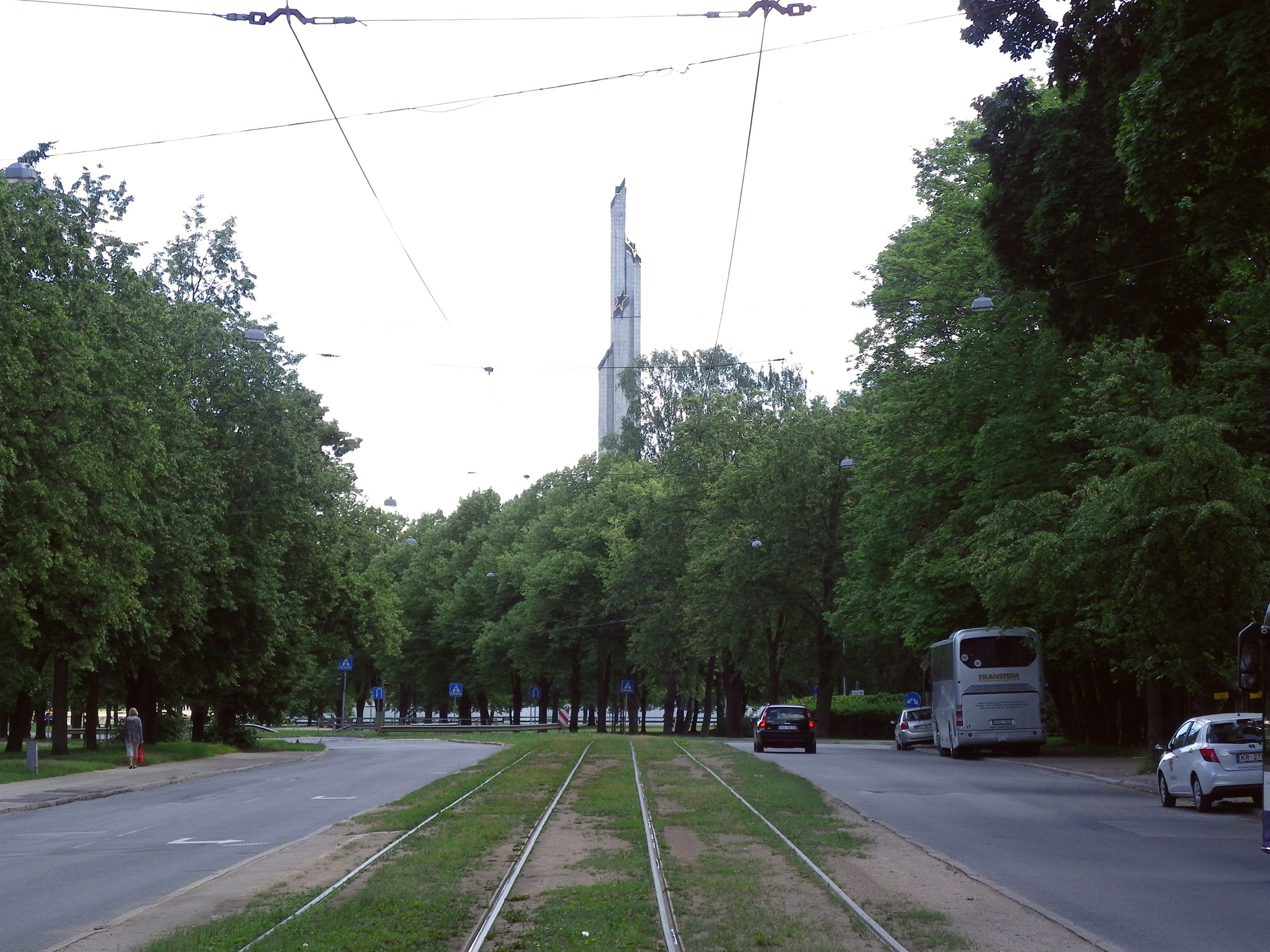
- Upper half of the Monument visible from Bāriņu Street in 2019
- Interactive map of Monument to the Liberators of Soviet Latvia and Riga from the German Fascist Invaders
- Location: Victory Park, Riga, Latvia
- Coordinates: 56.936803°N 24.085808°E
- Designer: Alexandr Bugaev
- Material: Bronze, granite, concrete
- Height: Obelisk: 79 metres (259 feet 2 inches)
- Beginning date: 8 May 1978
- Completion date: 1985
- Opening date: 1985
- Dedicated to: The Red Army soldiers that recaptured Riga and the rest of Latvia
- Dismantled date: 25 August 2022

The Monument to the Liberators of Soviet Latvia and Riga from the German Fascist Invaders, (Note: Latvian: Piemineklis Padomju Latvijas un Rīgas atbrīvotājiem no vācu fašistiskajiem iebrucējiem; Russian: Памятник освободителям Советской Латвии и Риги от немецко-фашистских захватчиков, romanized: Pamyatnik osvobodityelyam Sovetskoy Latvii i Rigi ot nemetsko-fashistskikh zakhvatchikov.) unofficially and more commonly known simply as the Victory Monument, (Note: Latvian: Uzvaras piemineklis; Russian: Памятник победы, romanized: Pamyatnik pobedy.) (Note: The unofficial name of the monument came from the Victory Park it was located in, which was not named after the Allied victory in World War II, but rather the Latvian National Armed Forces victory over the West Russian Volunteer Army in 1919 during the Latvian War of Independence. During the construction of the monument while Latvia was still under Soviet occupation, the park was renamed Victory Park again but this time reinterpreted as the Soviet victory in World War II.) was a memorial complex in Victory Park, Pārdaugava, Riga, Latvia, erected in 1985 to commemorate the Red Army soldiers who recaptured Riga and the rest of Latvia from German forces during the concluding stages of World War II (1944–1945). The complex comprised a 79-metre tall obelisk that consisted of five columns topped by five-pointed star, and two groups of sculptures – Homeland the Mother (Dzimtene-māte, Родина-мать) and a band of three soldiers.

The monument was the subject of long-standing controversy in modern Latvian society, concerning the historical memory of World War II and the legacy of Soviet rule. (Note: Since 1995, Latvia officially commemorates the defeat of Nazism and victims of World War II on 8 May just like in Western Europe with a flower-laying ceremony in Brothers' Cemetery attended by the President, Prime Minister and other Latvian dignitaries, while the main celebration at the Monument to the Liberators of Soviet Latvia and Riga from the German Fascist Invaders traditionally took place a day later, when Victory Day is celebrated in Russia and several other countries, and was largely attended by the country's Russian-speaking population, pro-Russian politicians from the Socialist Party of Latvia, Latvian Russian Union and Social Democratic Party "Harmony" and ambassadors of Russia and several other post-Soviet states.) Many ethnic Latvians regarded it not as a symbol of liberation, but, rather, the start of the Soviet re-occupation. The monument's obelisk was sometimes referred to in Latvian as "Moscow's Finger" (Maskavas pirksts) or okupeklis (a portmanteau of okupācija – 'occupation' and piemineklis – 'monument'), and juxtaposed to the Freedom Monument.

Following the 2022 Russian invasion of Ukraine, a decision was made to remove the monument. The demolition began 22 August 2022 and on 25 August 2022, the obelisk was toppled.

== History ==
=== Construction and early years ===
The monument was designed by architect Alexandr Bugaev and produced by sculptors Lev Bukovsky and Aivars Gulbis in 1985. In 1994, following restoration of Latvia's independence in the dissolution of the Soviet Union, the Socialist Party of Latvia took initiatives to revive Victory Day celebrations at the monument. The following year, around 11,000 people gathered for a 9 May event chaired by the vice-chairman of Socialist Party and MP Filips Stroganovs.

In 1997, the monument was unsuccessfully bombed by members of the Latvian ultranationalist group Pērkonkrusts, two of whom died during the bombing, while six others, including Igors Šiškins, were eventually sentenced to up to three years in prison in 2000. In 1998, the Victory Day celebration at the monument was organized by the For Human Rights in a United Latvia party for the first time; by 2005, the event had grown to resemble an open-air festival attended by around 260,000 people.

=== Calls for removal ===
In 2007, the Popular Front of Latvia and the Alliance of Latvian World War II Veterans sent an open letter to Prime Minister of Latvia Aigars Kalvītis urging him to prevent "any provocations that might discredit the Latvian state" and resolve any issues in regard to the monument's removal, claiming its existence led to "glorifying the ideals of a regime guilty of genocide that killed about 60 million people, including thousands of Latvians."

After the relocation of the Bronze Soldier in Tallinn in late April 2007, the issue of the monument was brought up again. Chairman of the populist radical right All for Latvia! party, Raivis Dzintars, called on Riga mayor Jānis Birks of the conservative TB/LNNK to organize a public discussion on the future of the monument. Birks, however, dismissed the calls as "very thoughtless and even harmful to Latvia". The chairman of the Union of Greens and Farmers parliamentary faction Augusts Brigmanis and the leader of Latvia's First Party/Latvian Way parliamentary faction Andris Bērziņš were similarly dismissive.

=== Popular petitions for and against removal ===
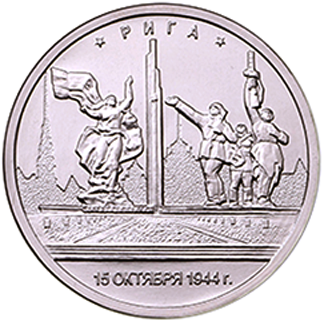
2016 Russian 5 rouble commemorative coin depicting the monument

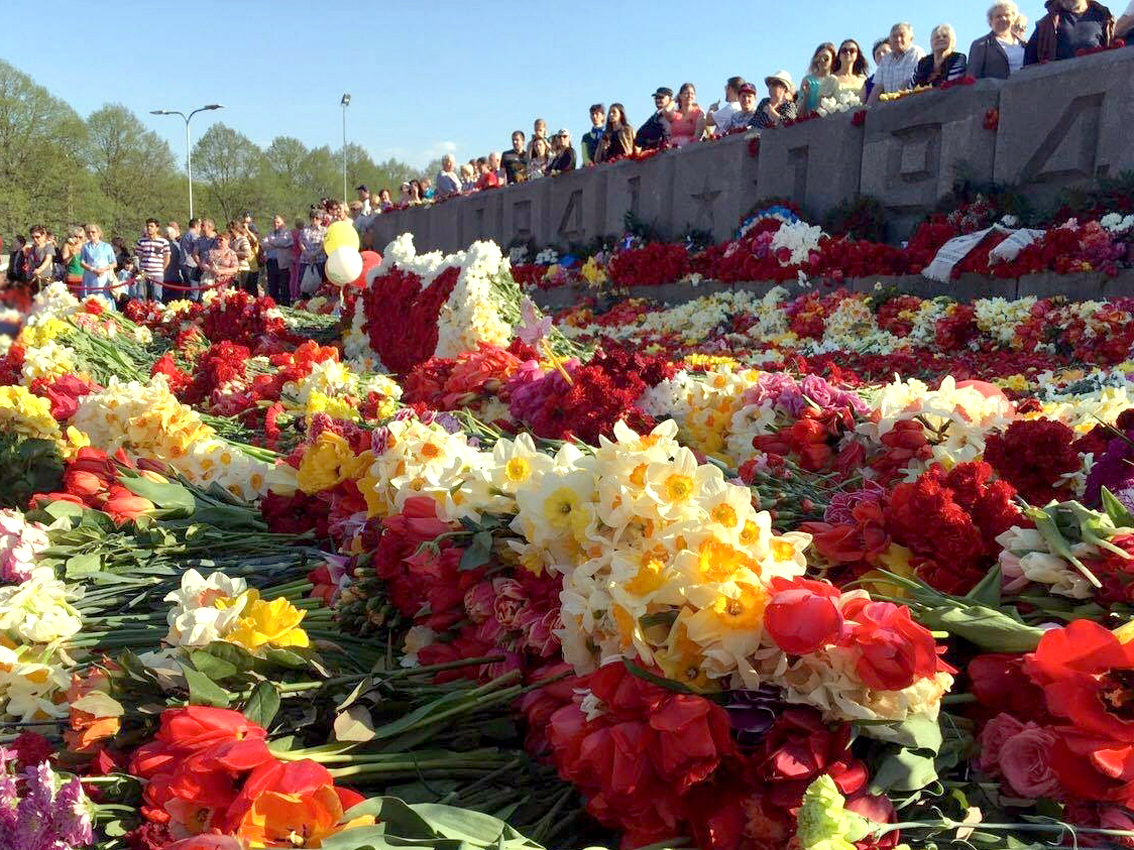
Flowers laid at the foot of the monument during the 2016 Victory Day celebration

In 2013, more than 11,000 signatures were collected on the online petition website ManaBalss.lv supporting removal of the monument and reconstruction of Victory Square the way it was originally envisioned in the 1930s before the Soviet occupation, commemorating Latvian victory in 1919 over the joint German-Russian West Russian Volunteer Army led by Pavel Bermondt-Avalov during the Latvian War of Independence. Justice Minister of Latvia Jānis Bordāns was among the supporters of the initiative, whereas Russian Foreign Ministry representative Alexander Lukashevich condemned the calls for the monument's removal.

On 29 June 2016, the Saeima Mandate, Ethics and Submissions Committee rejected the petition based on the argument of the Riga City Council that the location had already been developed and the Ministry of Foreign Affairs of Latvia that concluded that the monument was protected by a Latvian-Russian 1994 agreement on preservation and maintenance of memorials and burial sites.

In 2019, a similar petition by the same initiator gathered more than 10,000 signatures, and on 2 April, the Saeima Mandate, Ethics and Submissions Committee began discussing it: some members supported the removal, some opposed it, whereas some offered alternative solutions, such as renaming the monument and building an interactive museum of occupation under it. Concurrently, a counter petition by the Latvian Russian Union leader Tatjana Ždanoka on "the protection of monuments against Nazism", including the Monument to the Liberators of Soviet Latvia and Riga from the German Fascist Invaders, had gathered over 21,000 signatures.

=== Removal ===
In March 2022, following the 2022 Russian invasion of Ukraine, the Saeima prohibited public events within 200 metres of Soviet Army monuments on 9 May, while allowing individuals to lay flowers.

In April, a 2013 social media post by the Latvian Russian Union council member Jevgēņijs Osipovs was shared by him and other members and supporters of the party, in which he threatened "war" if the monument was moved "by even a millimetre".

On 11 April, the monument complex was declared unsafe by the Riga City Council and fenced off. A few weeks later, Velta Čebotarenoka, a representative of the 4 May Declaration Club uniting pro-independence members of the Supreme Council of Latvia, said that the "ghost symbolizing occupation, aggression, and russkij sovetskij mir [Russian Soviet world]" "should be removed at the earliest opportunity".

On 6 May, Latvian Prime Minister Krišjānis Kariņš announced that the monument's eventual removal was inevitable.

On 10 May, flowers laid at the monument the previous day were removed with a bulldozer, reportedly on the initiative of Riga City Council and without prior coordination with the police. Video of the removal spread online and was followed that evening by a spontaneous pro-Russian gathering at the monument, which ended in unrest and police detentions. Access to the monument was again restricted and later extended until 31 August, and three police officers present at the site on 10 May were suspended from duty.

On 12 May, a public demolition fundraising campaign was launched and more than 39,000 euros were donated by the end of the day when the Saeima voted to suspend the functioning of a section of an agreement between Latvia and Russia regarding the preservation of memorial structures.

The next day Riga City Council also voted in favour of the monument's removal, but the total amount of donations reached almost 200,000 euros. Russia submitted a request for compensation for the monument's removal, but was dismissed by Minister of Foreign Affairs of Latvia Edgars Rinkēvičs who made a reference to Vladimir Putin's 2004 response to Latvia's wish to recover its former territory Abrene by saying that Russia "will get a dead donkey ears, not a compensation".

The object [i.e., the monument] in Pārdaugava is not a mute witness of history. It has always been a symbol of Soviet occupation. The Red Army drove German occupants from the country and then established a Soviet occupation regime. It lasted another 45 years and claimed tens of thousands of innocent people’s lives. We did not call for the first or the second group of occupants. For a long time this object has been used by Russia’s autocratic regime. Most people come to this monument not as much to commemorate the fallen, but to publicly promote Kremlin's imperialistic narratives and vision for the world. But after the 2022 Russian invasion of Ukraine, this object left by occupants in Pārdaugava acquired a new meaning. Events of last week indicated that it can motivate some people to extreme, Russian war crime-glorifying behaviour in public space,

— President of Latvia Egils Levits, 16 May 2022

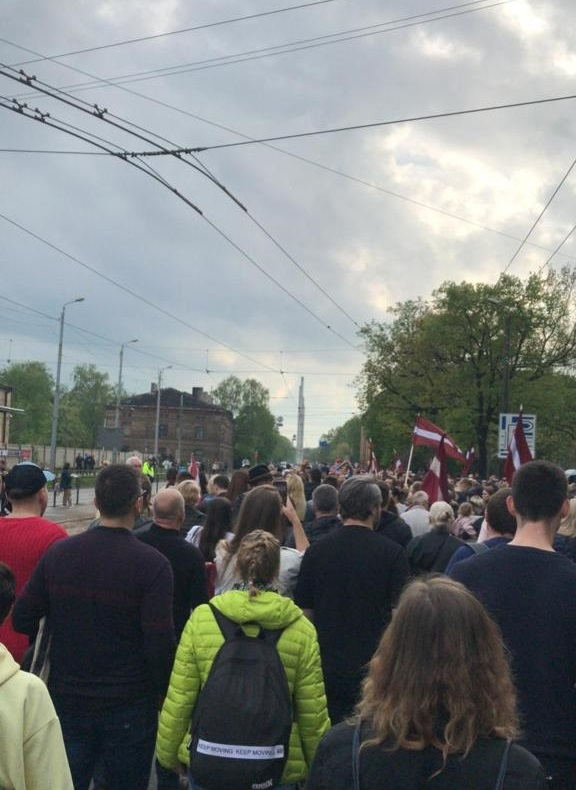
The 20 May rally "Getting Rid of Soviet Heritage" in Riga with the monument in the distance

On 20 May, a rally called "Getting Rid of Soviet Heritage" took place in Riga and was attended by approximately 5,000 people who walked from Freedom Monument to the Victory Monument, while a counter rally by Latvian Russian Union with a reverse route was not allowed over security concerns. According to a June 2022 survey, 49% of people supported the dismantling of the monument (72% ethnic Latvians and only 9% ethnic Russians), while 25% didn’t support it (76% ethnic Russians and only 10% ethnic Latvians).

On 22 August 2022, the monument's removal began with landscape preparations and State Security Service monitoring the situation for potential provocations. Seven people were detained by the police the same day and an additional 14 people a day later. The band of three soldiers was demolished on 23 August, and the monument's main element, the obelisk, was toppled on 25 August. On 29 August, the pool within the memorial complex was drained, and a tonne of fish, mostly carp, were removed. The removal of the sculptures and the debris from the site was officially completed on 14 October, while the removal of the memorial complex's foundation and remaining structures was scheduled to be completed by the end of the month.

==== Russia's response ====
The Investigative Committee of Russia immediately launched a criminal case over the monument's removal.

On 10 November 2022, the Ministry of Foreign Affairs of Russia summoned the Latvian ambassador Māris Riekstiņš in protest at the removal of Soviet monuments and threatened with the "right to retaliate, including by taking asymmetric steps". Rinkēvičs commented by saying that, "Any step they take will be followed by an adequate, stern, and solid response."

== Legal status and international response ==
The monument had been cited by the government of Russia as falling under Article 13 of the 1994 intergovernmental agreement between Latvia and Russia on the social protection of Russian military pensioners and their family members residing in Latvia, which was signed as part of the package of documents regulating the withdrawal of Russian troops from Latvia. Article 13 stated that, in accordance with international practice, Latvia would ensure the preservation, maintenance and upkeep of memorial structures and burial sites on its territory and would not obstruct visits to the graves of military pensioners and their family members or the holding of memorial ceremonies. Russia undertook a corresponding obligation to preserve and maintain memorial structures and graves of Latvians, Livonians and Latvian citizens who had died in combat or as a result of repression.

According to International Affairs, a journal published by the Ministry of Foreign Affairs of Russia, the agreement on the social protection of Russian military pensioners and their families in Latvia was unanimously endorsed at a plenary meeting of states participating in the Helsinki process in Vienna, and this was reflected in the meeting's final documents. Russia protested Latvia's decisions concerning Soviet monuments and the suspension of the intergovernmental agreement in diplomatic correspondence.

On 26 August 2022, after the monument had already been demolished, the United Nations Human Rights Committee asked the Ministry of Foreign Affairs of Latvia to suspend the dismantling, preserve the remaining parts of the structure and provide observations on the admissibility of complaints submitted by the applicants. The complaint had been submitted by five activists from the Workers' Front of Latvia. The Foreign Ministry of Latvia said that the request had been received only after the monument had been fully dismantled and therefore could not be implemented, while Latvia would provide its observations on admissibility in the ordinary procedure.

== Aftermath ==
Following the monument's demolition, the site was redeveloped as part of the renovation of Victory Park. A skatepark was planned to be built on the site of the monument as a potential temporary solution. The first stage of the project reopened to the public in November 2023 and included the restoration of a nine-hectare area with new landscaping, paths, plantings, bridges, tunnels and skateboarding infrastructure. According to LSM, the former pool and monument were no longer recognizable in the redesigned park. In August 2025, Riga opened a further five-hectare active and sports zone in the park, including children's playgrounds, a water play area, bicycle tracks and outdoor fitness equipment.

In 2025, a reduced-scale replica of the monument was installed in the "Saved Europe" memorial park in Kaliningrad, Russia.

== See also ==
- Soviet occupation of Latvia in 1940
- Soviet re-occupation of Latvia in 1944
- German occupation of Latvia during World War II
- Baltic offensive
- Baltic strategic defensive operation
- Molotov–Ribbentrop Pact
- Riga offensive (1944)
