= Pērkonkrusts =

Latvian political party

Thunder Cross Pērkonkrusts
- Leader: Gustavs Celmiņš
- Founded: 12 May 1933; 93 years ago
- Dissolved: 1944; 82 years ago
- Split from: National Union
- Preceded by: Latvian National Association "Fire Cross"
- Newspaper: Pērkonkrusts
- Paramilitary wing: Greyshirts
- Membership: approx. 5–6,000 (1934 est.)
- Ideology: Para-Nazism; Corporate statism; Racial antisemitism; Anti-German sentiment
- Political position: Far-right
- Religion: Dievturība
- Colours: Red Grey (customary)
- Slogan: "Latvia for Latvians! Work and bread for Latvians!"
- Anthem: "We Want to Be Lords in Our Native Land"

Party flag

Pērkonkrusts (Latvian pronunciation: [ˈpæːr.kuɔn.krusts], "Thunder Cross") was a Latvian ultranationalist, anti-German, anti-Slavic, and antisemitic political party founded in 1933 by Gustavs Celmiņš, borrowing elements of German Nazism—but being unsympathetic to Hitler-style genuine Nazism at the time—and Italian Fascism. It was outlawed in 1934, its leadership arrested, and Celmiņš eventually exiled in 1937. Still-imprisoned members were persecuted under the first Soviet occupation; some collaborated with subsequently invading Nazi Germany forces in perpetrating the Holocaust. Pērkonkrusts continued to exist in some form until 1944, when Celmiņš, who had initially returned to work in the occupying German administration, was imprisoned.

Following the restoration of Latvia's independence in 1991, a new radical nationalist movement, also called Pērkonkrusts, was formed in 1995. The organization espouses many of the same values as its predecessor. Members have participated in efforts to bomb the Monument to the Liberators of Soviet Latvia and Riga from the German Fascist Invaders several times, leading to the arrest, trial and imprisonment of many of its members. Since around 2000 or 2006, the group has become almost inactive.

== Principles and ideology ==
Pērkonkrusts: What Is It? What Does It Want? How Does It Work?– party propaganda publication from 1933.

Pērkonkrusts has been categorised by scholars as either representing the radical right or fascism. Fascism researcher Roger Griffin describes Pērkonkrusts as having been a "small but genuine fascist opposition" which "pursued a revolutionary solution to the [economic] crisis and which would turn Latvia into an authoritarian state based on a new élite with a new corporatist economy", with its politics defined by "integralist nationalism". Building on Griffin's definition of generic fascism, a categorisation of Pērkonkrusts as "anti-German national socialism" has also been proposed in an article from 2015.

Aside from the party's newspaper, Pērkonkrusts (1933–34), the main source of information on the political platform of Pērkonkrusts can be found in the 1933 brochure, Pērkonkrusts: What Is It? What Does It Want? How Does It Work? (Latvian: Kas ir? Ko grib? Kā darbojas? Pērkonkrusts). This publication not only outlined the movement's political programme, but also included the complete party statutes.

With its slogan "Latvia for Latvians! Work and bread for Latvians!" (Latvian: Latviju latviešiem! Latviešiem darbu un maizi!), Pērkonkrusts wished to place all political and economic control of their country exclusively in the hands of ethnic Latvians. As a result, the party rejected the existing legislation that gave national minorities cultural autonomy. Pērkonkrusts aimed its propaganda against minorities who supposedly had taken over the Latvian economy (i.e. Baltic Germans, Jews) and the contemporary parliamentary politicians, whom it accused of corruption.

In a Latvian Latvia the question of minorities will not exist. ... This means that once and for all we renounce unreservedly bourgeois-liberal prejudice on the national question, we renounce historical, humanistic, or other constraints in pursuit of our one true aim—the good of the Latvian nation. Our God, our belief, our life's meaning, our goal is the Latvian nation: whoever is against its welfare is our enemy. ...
We assume that the only place in the world where Latvians can settle is Latvia. Other peoples have their own countries. ...
In one word—in a Latvian Latvia there will only be Latvians.

— Gustavs Celmiņš, "A Latvian Latvia"

Pērkonkrusts rejected Christianity as a foreign influence and suggested instead adopting Dievturība, which was an attempt to revive an assumed pre-Christian Latvian religion.

Despite its rural ideals, Pērkonkrusts gained most of its support in the urban areas like Riga, Cēsis, Valmiera, Jelgava, more specifically among students at the University of Latvia.

== Party symbols ==
"Thunder Cross" is one of the names for the swastika in Latvian, which was used as a symbol of the organization.

The group used a variation of the Roman or Hitler salute, and greeted with the Latvian phrase "Cīņai sveiks" ("Ready for battle" or "Hail the struggle").

According to Latvian historian Uldis Krēsliņš, although the party used both the swastika and the Roman salute, it was neither affiliated with, nor a copycat of German Nazism— as was the case with the United Latvian National Socialist Party headed by Jānis Štelmachers.

The uniform of Pērkonkrusts was a grey shirt and black beret.

== History ==
=== Before World War II ===
The fascist group Ugunskrusts (Fire Cross), one of the Latvian ethnic symbols as well as a sign which is a mirrored image of a swastika, was founded in Latvia in 1932 by Gustavs Celmiņš, but was soon outlawed by the government of Latvia. The former Ugunskrusts organisation reemerged immediately under the new name of Pērkonkrusts. By 1934, Pērkonkrusts is estimated to have had between 5,000 and 6,000 members, although the organization maintained that it had more.

Kārlis Ulmanis, leader of the conservative nationalist Peasants' Union Party and then Prime Minister of Latvia, proposed constitutional reforms in October 1933, which socialists feared would target the left more than the right. In November of the same year, seven communist deputies were arrested, while Pērkonkrusts officials were left alone. Because of political unrest, stemming partially from the growing power of the right, Ulmanis staged a bloodless coup d'état in May 1934, banning not only the Communist Party and Pērkonkrusts, but all parties and the Saeima (Parliament). Following the coup, Pērkonkrusts leader Celmiņš was imprisoned for three years and then banished from Latvia.

Although Pērkonkrusts did not exist officially after 1934, many former leaders and members acted with a degree of unity in subsequent years.

In the late 1930s, Celmiņš set up a 'foreign liaison office' of Pērkonkrusts in Helsinki, Finland. During his peripatetic exile, Celmiņš had established personal contacts with the representatives of other fascist groupings in Europe, most notably Romania's Corneliu Codreanu.

=== During World War II ===
Not long after the Molotov–Ribbentrop pact in 1939, Latvia was occupied by the Soviet Union. Whereas the Soviet regime released the Communists imprisoned by Ulmanis with great ceremony, political prisoners from Pērkonkrusts were not freed. Instead, more members of Pērkonkrusts were arrested by the Soviet authorities during 1940–1941, some of them being deported to Siberia.

Call for Pērkonkrusts members to join the Arājs Commando, published in the German-controlled newspaper Tēvija on 4 July 1941.

When the Germans invaded Latvia in late June 1941, Celmiņš, who had moved to Germany following Latvia's occupation in 1940, returned to Latvia as a Sonderführer in the service of the German Wehrmacht.

In early July, Pērkonkrusts was briefly permitted to operate openly again. Former Pērkonkrusts members were actively sought by the German authorities as volunteers for the Arajs Commando. According to research by historian Rudīte Vīksne, however, there were only a handful of members of Pērkonkrusts who played a role in the Holocaust in Latvia, their activities focused more on propaganda.

During the early phases of the Holocaust in Latvia, Mārtiņš Vagulāns, whom historian Valdis Lumans describes as a member of Pērkonkrusts, led a killing squad attached to the Sicherheitsdienst (SD) in the town of Jelgava. Historian Andrievs Ezergailis has countered that Vagulāns was not in fact a member of Pērkonkrusts, between whom and the Nazis existed "a wall of suspicion." Ezergailis has also argued, "I do not think that among the killers of the Jews there were more than ten Pērkonkrusts members, if that. They played a more significant role as purveyors of anti-Semitism in Nazi press."

The German authorities decisively banned the organization for good in August 1941. Some former Pērkonkrusts members collaborated with the Germans, while others maintained an anti-German sentiment and joined those groups subversively opposed to German occupation.

Celmiņš continued his outward collaboration with the Germans in the hopes that sizable Latvian military formations would be created. From February 1942, he headed the Committee for Organising Latvian Volunteers (Latvian: Latviešu brīvprātīgo organizācijas komiteja), the main function of which was the recruitment of Latvian men for the Latvian Auxiliary Police Battalions, known in German as Schutzmannschaften or simply Schuma. Aside from front-line combat duties, these battalions also participated in so-called anti-partisan operations in Latvia and Belarus that included the massacres of rural Jews and other civilians.

Pērkonkrusts members working within the SD apparatus in occupied Latvia would feed Celmiņš information, some of which he would include in his underground, anti-German publication Brīvā Latvija. This eventually led to Celmiņš and his associates being arrested, with Celmiņš ending up imprisoned in Flossenbürg concentration camp.

=== In modern Latvia ===
Pērkonkrusts flag from the 1990s.

A radical group claiming Pērkonkrusts's name emerged in the 1990s as an organization whose stated goal was the overthrow of the current unsatisfactory government and the establishment of a "Latvian Latvia". In 1995, three former members of the group "Rība's Defenders" - Valdis Raups, Aivars Vīksniņš and then-68-year-old Vilis Liniņš - joined up with martial artist Juris Rečs to reconstitute Pērkonkrusts. "Rība's Defenders" was an unregistered splinter group from the self-proclaimed successor organization of the pre-WWII Aizsargi, led by Jānis Rība. Members of the group were assigned code names, swore loyalty oaths, and senior members wore masks to initiate recruits. The organization was explicitly militaristic and considered itself a "Latvian fighting unit" pursuing a "holy liberation struggle."

The ideology of the group was primarily characterized by ethnic and racial nationalism, anti-semitism, anti-communism, anti-liberalism and opposed to free markets. Among the goals of Pērkonkrusts were a Latvia where the "Latvian would be the lord and master in his Fatherland... not in those of Latvian-speaking cosmopolitan bastards," and "racial purity of the Latvian people." Pērkonkrusts has opposed "Jew neo-Communists... half-Jews and their allies... enemy number one of the Latvian people."

Members of the reconstituted Pērkonkrusts tried three times to bomb the Monument to the Liberators of Soviet Latvia and Riga from the German Fascist Invaders. In one of the most serious incidents on the night of 5 June 1997, two of the members, Valdis Raups and Aivars Vīksniņš, were killed in the explosion. Another nine members were prosecuted for the bombing and received sentences ranging from a year and a half of probation to three years in prison. In 2000, most of the leaders of the current Pērkonkrusts were arrested and tried. The group ceased organised activities or was banned around 2006.

Gustavs Celmiņš Center logo

One of the previous leaders of the organization Igors Šiškins has tried to re-activate Pērkonkrusts again. He has claimed to represent Pērkonkrusts at various events, such as the marking of Remembrance day of the Latvian legionnaires and Soviet Victory Day (9 May) in Riga. On 9 May 2007, Šiškins was arrested for wearing forbidden symbols in public. Šiškins was similarly detained for displaying forbidden symbols on 9 May 2009. In 2006 a similar organization, the Gustavs Celmiņš' Center (Gustava Celmiņa centrs), which used the same symbols as Pērkonkrusts and also claimed to promote Dievturība, was registered with Šiškins becoming one of its leaders until the organization was dissolved by the Riga Regional Court in 2014.

In its relations with Latvia, the Foreign Ministry of the Russian Federation at times brings up the history of the Pērkonkrusts movement as evidence of present-day Latvia's "fascist" heritage.

In 2016, blogger Jānis Polis reported that the owner of the former GCC website is linked to purported fake news websites.

== See also ==
- Croix-de-Feu
