= Igors Šiškins =

Latvian politician

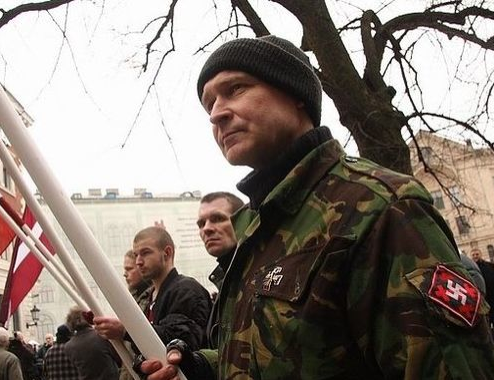
- Šiškins at the Remembrance Day of the Latvian Legionnaires on 16 March 2009
- Born: 9 June 1959 (age 67); Rēzekne, Latvian SSR
- Occupation: chimney sweep
- Organization(s): Pērkonkrusts (early 1990s–2006), Gustavs Celmiņš Centre (2007–2014)
- Political party: Fatherland Union (2006)
- Criminal charges: Involvement in bombing of the Monument to the Liberators of Soviet Latvia and Riga from the German Fascist Invaders in 1997
- Criminal penalty: Two year imprisonment

Igors Šiškins (born 9 June 1959 in Rēzekne) is a Latvian ultranationalist activist and politician. During the 1990s, Šiškins was a member of the Latvian ultranationalist organization Pērkonkrusts, where he was one of the members convicted for their involvement in bombing the Monument to the Liberators of Soviet Latvia and Riga from the German Fascist Invaders in June 1997.

== Biography ==
Šiškins was born in Rēzekne to a Russian father and a Latvian mother, but considers himself Latvian because his parents separated when he was young. In the Latvian SSR, Šiškins worked as a driver, locksmith, and stonecutter.

In the early 1990s, Šiškins joined the ultranationalist organization Pērkonkrusts. In late 1998, Šiškins was arrested and in 2000 sentenced to three years in prison for his involvement in the 1997 bombing of the Monument to the Liberators of Soviet Latvia and Riga from the German Fascist Invaders, having to remain in prison until April 24, 2001. The activity of Pērkonkrusts was banned in 2006.

In the 2006 Latvian parliamentary elections, Šiškins ran on the Fatherland Union ticket but the party received only 0.1% of the vote and he was not elected. In 2007, he founded the Gustavs Celmiņš Centre (GCC) as a continuation to the banned Pērkonkrusts. Gustavs Celmiņš Centre was similarly banned for extremist activity in December 2014 by the Latvian court following an application from the Latvian Security Police.

On July 1, 2010, Šiškins was one of the two people detained at a halted march commemorating the capture of Riga by Wehrmacht from the Red Army on July 1, 1941. In October 2012, Šiškins was arrested and charged for the attempted purchase of explosives. In 2015, on the Remembrance Day of the Latvian Legionnaires, Šiškins organized a separate procession attended by around 20 people.

Šiškins has remained active, maintaining a website under the Pērkonkrusts name. He is also believed to be one of the leaders of the anti-immigration "Stop Migration" fund and the radical right Antiglobalists Society that have attempted to establish a political party together.
