= List of wars of independence =

Armed struggles for political independence

This is a list of wars of independence, including armed conflicts fought for the independence of a nation. These wars may or may not have achieved the goal of political independence.

== List ==
Independence failed
Independence succeeded
De facto independence with limited recognition (Note: Applicable after 1815, when the constitutive theory of statehood was developed through the Congress of Vienna)
Autonomy granted
Stalemate
Ongoing conflict

=== Ancient (before 500 AD) ===
Dates	Name	Independence side	Anti-independence state	Region	Result
522–520 BC	Rebellion of Petubastis III	Egypt	Persia	Middle East and North Africa	Rebellion suppressed; consolidation of Persian rule in Egypt
499–493 BC	Ionian Revolt	Ionia, Aeolis, Doris, Caria, Cyprus	Persia	Europe	Defeat of Greek insurgents; beginning of the Greco-Persian Wars
484 BC	Rebellions of Bel-shimanni and Shamash-eriba	Babylonia	Persia	Middle East and North Africa	Rebellions suppressed; consolidation of Persian rule in Babylonia
460–454 BC	Rebellion of Inaros II (Note: In cooperation with the Greeks in the Wars of the Delian League)	Egypt	Persia	Middle East and North Africa	Rebellion suppressed
411–400 BC	Rebellion of Amyrtaeus	Egypt	Persia	Middle East and North Africa	Restoration of Egyptian independence from Persia
335 BC	Battle of Thebes	Thebes	Macedonia	Europe	Destruction of Thebes
323–322 BC	Lamian War	Athens, Phocis, Aetolia, Thessaly	Macedonia	Europe	Defeat of rebel Greek states
209–207 BC	Late Qin peasant rebellions^{[zh]}	Chu, Zhao, Yan, Wei, Qi, Hann	Qin China	Asia-Pacific	Fall of the Qin dynasty; establishment of the Eighteen Kingdoms; beginning of the Chu–Han War
206–186 BC	Great Theban Revolt	Upper Egypt	Ptolemaic Empire	Middle East and North Africa	Revolt suppressed
167–141 BC	Maccabean Revolt	Hasmonean Judea	Seleucid Empire	Middle East and North Africa	Independence of Judea from the Seleucid Empire; creation of the Jewish theocratic Hasmonean dynasty
111 BC	Han conquest of Nanyue (Note: In response to the palace coup led by Nanyue ministers who oppose unification with Han China)	Nanyue	Han China	Asia-Pacific	Nanyue defeated and annexed by China
54–50 BC	Caesar's pacification of Gaul (Note: Part of the Gallic Wars, including Ambiorix's revolt and Vercingetorix's revolt)	Gaulish tribes	Roman Republic	Europe	Revolts suppressed; Gaul annexed by Rome
39–37 BC	Jewish resistance to Herodian invasion (Note: Herod the Great, with Roman political and military support, attacks Antigonus the Hasmonean, who proclaims himself king in an attempt to free Judea from Roman authority.)	Hasmonean Judea	Roman Republic	Middle East and North Africa	Fall of the Hasmonean dynasty; establishment of the Roman client Herodian kingdom
6–9 AD	Great Illyrian Revolt	Illyrian tribes	Roman Empire	Europe	Revolt suppressed
9	Battle of the Teutoburg Forest	Germanic tribes	Roman Empire	Europe	Liberation of Germania from Roman rule
15–24	Tacfarinas War	Musulamii, Mauri, Garamantes, Gaetuli	Roman Empire	Middle East and North Africa	Defeat of Berber tribesmen; consolidation of Roman rule in Africa
40–43	Trưng sisters' rebellion	Viet tribes	Han China	Asia-Pacific	Rebellion suppressed
60–61	Boudican revolt	Brittonic tribes	Roman Empire	Europe	Revolt suppressed
66–135	Jewish–Roman wars	Judea	Roman Empire	Middle East and North Africa	Revolts suppressed; Jewish diaspora
137–138	Cham revolt against the Han dynasty	Lâm Ấp	Han China	Asia-Pacific	Foundation of Champa
248	Rebellion of Lady Triệu	Vietnam	Eastern Wu	Asia-Pacific	Rebellion suppressed
260–274	Gallic secession	Gallic Empire	Roman Empire	Europe	Disestablishment of the Gallic Empire; reestablishment of Roman imperial rule in Gaul, Hispania, and Britain
270–273	Zenobia's revolt	Palmyrene Empire	Roman Empire	Middle East and North Africa	Disestablishment of the Palmyrene Empire; reestablishment of Roman imperial rule in Egypt, Palestine, Phoenicia, Syria, and Anatolia
286–296	Carausian revolt	Britannic Empire	Roman Empire	Europe	Disestablishment of the Britannic Empire; reestablishment of Roman imperial rule in Britain and northern Gaul
351–352	Jewish revolt against Constantius Gallus	Judea	Roman Empire	Middle East and North Africa	Revolt suppressed
372–375	Rebellion of Firmus^{[fr]}	Quinquegentiani	Roman Empire	Middle East and North Africa	Defeat of Berber insurgents
484–573	Samaritan revolts	Samaria	Byzantine Empire	Middle East and North Africa	Revolts suppressed

=== Medieval (500–1500) ===
Dates	Name	Independence side	Anti-independence state	Region	Result
541–543	Rebellion of Lý Bôn	Vietnam	Liang China	Asia-Pacific	Liberation of Vietnam from Chinese rule
660–663	Paekche restoration movement	Paekche Korea	Tang China; Silla Korea	Asia-Pacific	Movement defeated; Silla takes over Paekche territory after the Silla-Tang War
668–673	Goguryeo restoration movement	Goguryeo Korea	Tang China	Asia-Pacific	Movement defeated
679–682	Göktürk restoration movement	Second Turkic Khaganate	Tang China	Asia-Pacific	Restoration of Göktürk independence from Chinese rule
698	Battle of Tianmenling	Mohe	Zhou China	Asia-Pacific	Foundation of Parhae
720–832	Bashmurian revolts	Bashmur	Umayyad Caliphate (720, 749); Abbasid Caliphate (767, 831–832)	Middle East and North Africa	Defeat of Egyptian Coptic insurgents
722	Battle of Covadonga	Asturias	Umayyad Caliphate	Europe	Independence of Asturias from the Umayyad Caliphate; beginning of the Reconquista
722–723	Rebellion of Mai Thúc Loan	Vietnam	Tang China	Asia-Pacific	Rebellion suppressed
733–793	Frisian resistance to Frankish rule	Frisia	Francia	Europe	Revolts suppressed
740–743	Berber Revolt	Barghawata, Tlemcen, Sijilmasa	Umayyad Caliphate	Middle East and North Africa	Independence of Berber states in western Maghreb from the Umayyad Caliphate
750–754	Tianbao War	Nanzhao	Tang China	Asia-Pacific	Liberation of Nanzhao from Chinese suzerainty
782–804	Saxon resistance to Frankish rule (Note: Part of the Saxon Wars)	Saxony	Carolingian Empire (Francia)	Europe	Revolts suppressed; Saxony annexed by Francia
791–803	Rebellion of Phùng Hưng	Vietnam	Tang China	Asia-Pacific	Rebellion suppressed
794	Battle of Shenchuan	Nanzhao	Tibetan Empire	Asia-Pacific	Liberation of Nanzhao from Tibetan suzerainty
816–837	Babak Khorramdin Revolt	Iran; Khurramites; Karenids	Abbasid Caliphate	Middle East and North Africa	Revolt suppressed
824	Second Battle of Roncevaux Pass	Pamplona	Carolingian Empire (Francia)	Europe	Foundation of the Basque-speaking Kingdom of Navarre
841–847	Yu'firid revolt	Yu'firids	Abbasid Caliphate	Middle East and North Africa	Independence of Yemen from the Abbasid Caliphate
864–869	Alavid revolt	Alavids	Abbasid Caliphate	Middle East and North Africa	Independence of Tabaristan from the Abbasid Caliphate
876	Rebellion of Domagoj	Croatia	East Francia	Europe	Liberation of Croatia from Frankish suzerainty
928–999	Parhae resistance to Khitan rule	Later Parhae (928–938); Chŏngan (938–999)	Liao	Asia-Pacific	Partial restoration of Parhae territory in 928; reconquest by Liao in 991
938	Battle of Bạch Đằng	Vietnam	Southern Han	Asia-Pacific	Liberation of Vietnam from Chinese rule
982–1004	Jiqian's rebellion	Tangut	Song China	Asia-Pacific	Foundation of Western Xia
983	Slavic revolt against the Ottonian dynasty	Lutici	Holy Roman Empire	Europe	Liberation of Polabian Slavs from German rule
1029–1070	Sinhalese resistance to Chola rule	Polonnaruwa	Chola Empire	Asia-Pacific	Restoration of Sri Lankan independence from the Chola Empire
1034–1042	Rebellion of Stefan Vojislav^{[sr]}	Duklja	Byzantine Empire	Europe	Restoration of Serb independence from the Byzantine Empire
1038–1047	Miecław's Rebellion	Miecław's State	Poland	Europe	Defeat of Miecław; reintegration of Mazovia into Poland
1040–1041	Uprising of Petar Delyan	Bulgaria	Byzantine Empire	Europe	Uprising suppressed
1042–1054	Nong Zhigao rebellions	Nantian	Vietnam, Song China	Asia-Pacific	Defeat of Nùng insurgents
1067–1075	Anglo-Saxon resistance to Norman rule (Note: Part of the Norman Conquest)	England	Normandy	Europe	Revolts suppressed
1072–1073	Uprising of Georgi Voyteh	Bulgaria	Byzantine Empire	Europe	Uprising suppressed
1079–1080	Rubenid revolt	Cilician Armenia	Byzantine Empire	Europe	Independence of Cilician Armenia from the Byzantine Empire
1089–1099	Georgian restoration from the Great Turkish Troubles	Georgia	Seljuk Empire	Europe	Liberation of Georgia from Seljuk suzerainty; beginning of Georgian Golden Age
1147–1150	Cham resistance to Khmer occupation	Champa	Cambodia	Asia-Pacific	Restoration of Cham independence from Khmer occupation
1176	Battle of Legnano (Note: The Lombard League askes the Holy Roman Emperor for the exemption from all types of taxes and the absence of any kind of interference by the emperor in local matters.)	Lombard League	Holy Roman Empire	Europe	Peace of Constance: imperial prerogatives granted to the Lombard League
1177–1181	Khmer resistance to Cham occupation	Cambodia	Champa	Asia-Pacific	Restoration of Khmer independence from Cham occupation
1185–1188	Uprising of Asen and Peter	Second Bulgarian Empire	Byzantine Empire	Europe	Restoration of Bulgarian independence from the Byzantine Empire
1191–1203	Cham resistance to Khmer invasions (Note: The siries of invasions is a response to the Cham expulsion of the Khmer vassal ruler along with the invaders in 1191.)	Champa	Cambodia	Asia-Pacific	Champa recognized by Vietnam in 1199; annexed by Cambodia in 1203
1221–1231	Khwarazmian restoration movement	Khwarazmian Empire	Mongol Empire	Asia-Pacific	Movement defeated
1256–1259	Rebellion of David Narin	Western Georgia	Ilkhanate	Europe	Liberation of Western Georgia from Mongol rule
1270–1273	Sambyeolcho Rebellion	Sambyeolcho	Yuan Empire	Asia-Pacific	Rebellion suppressed; Korea under Mongol rule
1282–1302	War of the Sicilian Vespers	Sicily	Angevin-Neapolitan monarchy	Europe	Liberation of Sicilly from Angevin rule
1285–1287	Mon revolt against the Pagan dynasty	Martaban	Myanmar	Asia-Pacific	Foundation of the Hanthawaddy kingdom
1296–1357	Wars of Scottish Independence	Scotland	England	Europe	Restoration of Scottish independence from English authority following the succession crisis
1300–1301	Second Mongol invasion of Myanmar (Note: In response to Myinsaing's usurpation of the throne of the Mongol vassal Pagan dynasty)	Myinsaing	Yuan Empire	Asia-Pacific	Myinsaing retains independence; Mongol withdrawal from Upper Burma
1326	Cham revolt against the Trần dynasty	Champa	Vietnam	Asia-Pacific	Restoration of Cham independence from Viet suzerainty
1327	Tver Uprising	Tver	Golden Horde	Europe	Defeat of Russian insurgents
1330	Battle of Posada	Wallachia	Hungary	Europe	Independence of the Romanian state from Hungary
1343–1345	Saint George's Night Uprising	Estonians	Denmark; Teutonic Order	Europe	Uprising suppressed; transfer of Estonia from Denmark to the Teutonic Order
1346–1347	Rebellion of Ismail Mukh	Bahmani Sultanate	Delhi Sultanate	Asia-Pacific	Creation of the Bahmani Sultanate; loss of Delhi's territory in the Deccan
1351–1368	Red Turban Rebellions	Ming China	Yuan Empire	Asia-Pacific	Creation of the Han-led Ming dynasty; Yuan retreat to the Mongolian Plateau
1353–1359	Ekdala Wars	Bengal Sultanate	Delhi Sultanate	Asia-Pacific	Independence of Bengal from Delhi
1357; 1394	Liberation of Angkor from Siamese occupations	Cambodia	Thailand	Asia-Pacific	Restorations of Khmer independence from Siamese occupations; beginning of Post-Angkor period
1400–1415	Glyndŵr rebellion	Wales	England	Europe	Rebellion suppressed
1408–1413	Uprising of Konstantin and Fruzhin	Second Bulgarian Empire	Ottoman Empire	Europe	Uprising suppressed
1415–1445	Adalite restoration movement	Adal Sultanate	Ethiopia	Sub-Saharan Africa	Independence of the Adal Sultanate from Ethiopia
1418–1427	Lam Sơn uprising	Vietnam	Ming China	Asia-Pacific	Liberation of Vietnam from Chinese rule
1432–1479	Albanian–Ottoman Wars (Note: Including Skanderbeg's rebellion)	League of Lezhë	Ottoman Empire	Europe	Independence of Albania in 1444; reconquest by the Ottoman Empire in 1479
1434–1436	Engelbrekt rebellion	Sweden	Kalmar Union	Europe	Temporary liberation of Sweden from Danish rule
1480	Great Stand on the Ugra River	Muscovy	Golden Horde	Europe	End of the Tatar yoke in Russia
1499	Swabian War	Swiss Confederacy	Holy Roman Empire	Europe	De facto independence of Switzerland from the Holy Roman Empire
1500	Rebellion of Oyake Akahachi^{[jp]}	Ishigaki	Ryukyu	Asia-Pacific	Rebellion suppressed; Sakishima Islands annexed by Ryukyu

=== Early modern (1500–1800) ===
Dates	Name	Independence side	Anti-independence state	Region	Result
1511–1529	Spanish–Taíno War of San Juan–Borikén	Taíno of Puerto Rico	Spain	Americas	Revolt suppressed
1515–1523	Frisian peasant rebellion	Frisia	Habsburg Netherlands	Europe	Rebellion suppressed
1521–1523	Swedish War of Liberation	Sweden	Kalmar Union	Europe	Restoration of Swedish independence from the Kalmar Union
1536–1572	Inca resistance to Spanish rule	Inca Empire	Spain	Americas	Neo-Inca conquered by Spain
1540–1542	Mixtón War	Caxcan	Spain	Americas	Revolt suppressed
1548–1582	Bayano Wars	Panamanian Maroons	Spain	Americas	Revolts suppressed
1549	Battle of Danki	Cayor	Jolof Empire	Sub-Saharan Africa	Disintegration of the Jolof Empire
1549–1552	Mon resistance to the Toungoo dynasty	Hanthawaddy	Myanmar	Asia-Pacific	Revolt suppressed
1552–1556	Kazan rebellion	Kazan	Russia	Europe	Rebellion suppressed
1568–1571	War of the Alpujarras	Granada	Spain	Europe	Revolt suppressed; expulsion of the Moriscos
1568–1648	Eighty Years' War	Netherlands	Spain	Europe	Independence of the Netherlands from Spain
1573	Maldivian revolt against Portuguese rule	Maldives	Portugal	Asia-Pacific	Restoration of Maldivian independence from Portugal
1584–1593	Nandric War (Note: Including Naresuan's Elephant Battle in 1593)	Thailand	Myanmar	Asia-Pacific	Restoration of Siamese independence from Burmese suzerainty
1586–1589	Kashmiri resistance to Mughal rule	Kashmir Sultanate	Mughal Empire	Asia-Pacific	Movement defeated
1590–1600	Bozhou rebellion	Bozhou	Ming China	Asia-Pacific	Defeat of Miao insurgents; liquidation of autonomy of Bozhou
1593–1603	Tyrone's Rebellion	Irish confederacy	England	Europe	Defeat of Irish clans; end of Gaelic rule in Ireland
1594	Uprising in Banat	Serbia	Ottoman Empire	Europe	Uprising suppressed
1594–1596	Nalyvaiko Uprising	Zaporozhian Cossacks	Poland–Lithuania	Europe	Uprising suppressed
1596	Himara Revolt	Albania	Ottoman Empire	Europe	Revolt suppressed
1596–1597	Grdan's Uprising	Serbia	Ottoman Empire	Europe	Uprising suppressed
1597–1636	Qasimid revolt	Qasimid State	Ottoman Empire	Middle East and North Africa	Independence of Yemen from the Ottoman Empire
1598	First Tarnovo Uprising	Bulgaria	Ottoman Empire	Europe	Uprising suppressed
1598–1604	Destruction of the Seven Cities	Mapuche	Spain	Americas	Liberation of southern Chile from Spanish rule
1600; 1611	Rebellions of Dionysios	Greece	Ottoman Empire	Europe	Rebellions suppressed
1601–1607	Acaxee Rebellion	Acaxee	Spain	Americas	Rebellion suppressed
1604–1606	Bocskai uprising	Hungary	Habsburg monarchy	Europe	Liberation of Transylvania from Habsburg rule
1611–1612	Russian resistance to Polish–Lithuanian occupation of Moscow (Note: Part of the Time of Troubles)	Russia	Poland–Lithuania	Europe	Liberation of Russia from Polish–Lithuanian occupation following the succession crisis
1614–1659	Kakheti resistance to Iranian rule	Kakheti	Safavid Iran	Europe	Defeat of Georgian insurgents
1616–1620	Tepehuán Revolt	Tepehuán	Spain	Americas	Revolt suppressed
1618–1620	Bohemian Revolt	Bohemia	Habsburg monarchy	Europe	Defeat of Czech insurgents; Bohemian elective monarchy replaced by Habsburg hereditary succession; beginning of the Thirty Years' War
1620–1621	Karaiyar resistance to Portuguese rule	Jaffna	Portugal	Asia-Pacific	Defeat of Sri Lankan Tamil insurgents
1621–1629	She–An Rebellion	Mu'ege, Shuidong	Ming China	Asia-Pacific	Defeat of Yi insurgents; liquidation of autonomy of Shuidong
1640–1659	Reapers' War	Catalan Republic	Spain	Europe	Partition of Catalonia between Spain and France
1640–1668	Portuguese Restoration War	Portugal	Spain	Europe	Restoration of Portuguese independence from Spain
1646	Battle of Passempe	Bone Sultanate	Gowa Sultanate	Asia-Pacific	Defeat of Buginese insurgents
1647–1648	Neapolitan Revolt	Neapolitan Republic	Spain	Europe	Revolt suppressed
1648–1657	Khmelnytsky Uprising	Cossack Hetmanate	Poland–Lithuania	Europe	Creation of the Cossack Hetmanate; beginning of the Polish–Russian War of 1654–1667
1669–1672	Shakushain's revolt	Ainu	Edo Japan	Asia-Pacific	Revolt suppressed; consolidation of Japanese rule in Hokkaido
1670–1699	Spanish–Chamorro Wars	Chamorro	Spain	Asia-Pacific	Revolts suppressed
1679–1707	Rathore rebellion	Marwar	Mughal Empire	Asia-Pacific	Liberation of Marwar from Mughal rule
1680–1695	Rebellion of Zumbi	Palmares	Portugal	Americas	Defeat of Afro-Brazilian insurgents
1680–1696	Pueblo Revolts	Puebloans	Spain	Americas	Liberation of New Mexico from Spanish rule in 1680; reconquest by Spain in 1692
1688	Chiprovtsi uprising	Bulgaria	Ottoman Empire	Europe	Uprising suppressed
1689	Karposh's uprising	Kumanovo	Ottoman Empire	Europe	Uprising suppressed
1703–1711	Rákóczi's War of Independence	Hungary	Habsburg monarchy	Europe	Revolt suppressed; consolidation of Habsburg rule in Transylvania
1709–1710	Rebellion of Pablo Presbere^{[es]}	Talamanca	Spain	Americas	Liberation of Talamanca from Spanish rule
1709–1711	Kandahar Rebellion	Hotak Afghanistan	Safavid Iran	Asia-Pacific	Independence of Afghanistan from Iran
1712–1713	Tzeltal Rebellion	Tzeltal Maya	Spain	Americas	Rebellion suppressed
1722–1730	Armenian liberation struggle	Armenia	Safavid Iran; Ottoman Empire	Europe	Revolt suppressed
1727	Northern Thai revolt against the Nyaungyan dynasty	Lanna	Myanmar	Asia-Pacific	Restoration of Northern Thai independence from Myanmar
1728–1739	First Maroon War	Jamaican Maroons	Britain	Americas	Autonomy granted to Jamaican Maroons
1729–1731	Natchez revolt	Natchez	France	Americas	Revolt suppressed; transfer of French Indies Company's power over Louisiana to the French Crown
1729–1769	Corsican War of Independence	Corsican Republic	Genoa (1729–1768); France (1768–1769)	Europe	De facto independence of Corsica from Genoa in 1755; annexed by France in 1769
1733	Slave insurrection on St. John	Saint John	Denmark–Norway	Americas	Insurrection suppressed
1740	Mon revolt against the Nyaungyan dynasty	Hanthawaddy	Myanmar	Asia-Pacific	Restoration of Mon independence from Myanmar
1742–1752	Juan Santos Rebellion	Asháninka, Quechua, Yanesha, Shipibo, Piro	Spain	Americas	Liberation of Gran Pajonal and Cerro de la Sal from Spanish rule
1744–1829	Dagohoy rebellion	Bohol	Spain	Asia-Pacific	Liberation of Bohol from Spanish rule in 1745; reconquest by Spain in 1829
1754–1762	Kashmiri revolt against Afghan rule	Kashmir	Durrani Afghanistan	Asia-Pacific	Independence of Kashmir in 1754; reconquest by Afghanistan in 1762
1755–1758	Amursana rebellion	Dzungar Khanate	Qing Empire	Asia-Pacific	Dzungar genocide
1756–1757	Chingünjav rebellion^{[zh]}	Outer Mongolia	Qing Empire	Asia-Pacific	Rebellion suppressed
1757–1759	Revolt of the Altishahr Khojas^{[zh]}	Altishahr Khojas	Qing Empire	Asia-Pacific	Revolt suppressed; East Turkestan totally under Qing rule
1760–1761	Tacky's Revolt	Jamaica	Britain	Americas	Revolt suppressed
1762–1765	Palaris revolt	Pangasinan	Spain	Asia-Pacific	Revolt suppressed
1763–1764	Berbice Rebellion	Guyana	Netherlands	Americas	Rebellion suppressed
1763–1766	Pontiac's War	Indigenous peoples in the Great Lakes region	Britain	Americas	Royal Proclamation of 1763: establishment of the Indian Reserve
1766–1834	Chuar Rebellion	Ghatshila, Dhalbhum, Midnapore, Bishnupur, Barabhum	Britain	Asia-Pacific	Rebellion suppressed; consolidation of British rule in Jungle Terry
1767	Battle of Phosamton	Thailand	Myanmar	Asia-Pacific	Liberation of Siam from Burmese occupation; beginning of Taksin's reunification of Thailand
1770	Orlov revolt	Greece	Ottoman Empire	Europe	Revolt suppressed
1775–1783	American Revolutionary War	United States	Britain	Americas	Independence of the United States from Britain
1780–1783	Rebellion of Túpac Amaru II	Aymara-Quechua	Spain	Americas	Rebellion suppressed
1780–1810	Nuku rebellion	Tidore Sultanate	Netherlands	Asia-Pacific	Restoration of Tidore independence in 1801; reconquest by the Netherlands in 1810
1785–1795	Northwest Indian War	United Indian Nations	United States	Americas	Defeat of the Native confederacy; U.S. annexation of the Old Northwest
1789–1790	Brabant Revolution	United Belgian States	Habsburg monarchy	Europe	Revolution suppressed
1791–1804	Haitian Revolution	Haiti	France	Americas	Independence of Haiti from France
1794	Kościuszko Uprising	Poland–Lithuania	Russia; Prussia	Europe	Uprising suppressed; fall of Poland–Lithuania; Third Partition of Poland
1798–1804	United Irishmen Rebellion	Republic of Connacht	Britain	Europe	Rebellion suppressed; abolition of the Parliament of Ireland; establishment of the United Kingdom of Great Britain and Ireland
1799–1803	Rebellion of William Bowles	State of Muskogee	Spain	Americas	Rebellion suppressed

=== Late modern (1800–1945) ===
Dates	Name	Independence side	Anti-independence state	Region	Result
1802–1818	Russo-Tlingit War^{[ru]}	Tlingit	Russia	Americas	Defeat of Tlingit clans
1803	Vanni resistance to British rule	Vannimai	Britain	Asia-Pacific	Defeat of Sri Lankan Tamil insurgents
1804–1817	Serbian Revolution	Revolutionary Serbia	Ottoman Empire	Europe	Establishment of the Principality of Serbia under Ottoman suzerainty
1806	Vellore Mutiny	Mysore	Britain	Asia-Pacific	Revolt suppressed
1806–1807	Greater Poland uprising of 1806	Poland	Prussia	Europe	Creation of the Duchy of Warsaw
1807	Tunisian–Algerian War of 1807	Tunisia	Algeria	Middle East and North Africa	Liberation of Tunisia from Algerian suzerainty
1808–1814	Peninsular War	Spain	France	Europe	Restoration of Spanish independence from French rule; beginning of the Spanish American wars of independence
1809–1822	Ecuadorian War of Independence	Ecuador	Spain	Americas	Independence of Ecuador from Spain; federation into Gran Colombia
1809–1825	Bolivian War of Independence	Bolivia	Spain	Americas	Independence of Bolivia from Spain
1809–1826	Peruvian War of Independence	Peru	Spain	Americas	Independence of Peru from Spain
1810	Imereti resistance to Russian rule^{[ka]}	Imereti	Russia	Europe	Revolt suppressed; Georgia totally under Russian rule
1810–1813	Tecumseh's War	Tecumseh's confederacy	United States	Americas	Defeat of the Native confederacy
1810–1818	Argentine War of Independence	Río de la Plata	Spain	Americas	Independence of Argentina from Spain
1810–1821	Mexican War of Independence	Mexico	Spain	Americas	Independence of Mexico from Spain
1810–1823	Venezuelan War of Independence	Venezuela	Spain	Americas	Independence of Venezuela from Spain; federation into Gran Colombia
1810–1825	Colombian War of Independence	Colombia	Spain	Americas	Independence of Colombia from Spain; federation into Gran Colombia
1810–1826	Chilean War of Independence	Chile	Spain	Americas	Independence of Chile from Spain
1813	German campaign (Note: Part of the War of the Sixth Coalition)	German states	France	Europe	Dissolution of the Rhine Confederation
1814	Swedish–Norwegian War	Norway	Sweden	Europe	Convention of Moss: establishment of the United Kingdoms of Sweden and Norway
1817	Pernambucan revolution	Pernambuco	Portugal	Americas	Defeat of Brazilian insurgents
1817	Pattimura War^{[id]}	Ambon	Netherlands	Asia-Pacific	Revolt suppressed
1817–1818	Uva-Wellassa Rebellion	Kandy	Britain	Asia-Pacific	Defeat of Sinhalese insurgents; consolidation of British rule in Sri Lanka
1817–1818	Paika Rebellion	Khurda	Britain	Asia-Pacific	Rebellion suppressed; end of Paika rule in Odisha
1817–1819	Third Anglo-Maratha War	Maratha Empire	Britain	Asia-Pacific	Fall of the Maratha Empire
1819–1826	Manipuri resistance to Burmese occupation	Manipur	Myanmar	Asia-Pacific	Liberation of Manipur from Burmese occupation
1820	Totonicapán Uprising	Kʼicheʼ Maya	Spain	Americas	Uprising suppressed
1820	Neak sel Rebellion	Cambodia	Vietnam	Asia-Pacific	Rebellion suppressed
1821–1822	Assamese resistance to Burmese occupation	Assam	Myanmar	Asia-Pacific	Defeat of Ahom insurgents; Britain takes over Assam after the First Anglo-Burmese War
1821–1829	Greek War of Independence	Greece	Ottoman Empire	Europe	Independence of Greece from the Ottoman Empire
1822–1824	Brazilian War of Independence	Brazil	Portugal	Americas	Independence of Brazil from Portugal
1823	Novales revolt	Philippines	Spain	Asia-Pacific	Revolt suppressed
1823	Rebellion of Ghezo	Dahomey	Oyo Empire	Sub-Saharan Africa	Liberation of Dahomey from Oyo suzerainty
1825–1830	Java War	Java	Netherlands	Asia-Pacific	Revolt suppressed
1826–1828	Anouvong's Rebellion	Lan Xang; Vientiane; Champasak	Thailand	Asia-Pacific	Defeat of rebel Lao states; beginning of the Siamese–Vietnamese War of 1833–1834
1828	Ahom rebellion	Assam	Britain	Asia-Pacific	Restoration of the Ahom dynasty under British protection
1830–1831	Titumir Rebellion	Tariqah-i-Muhammadiya in Bengal	Britain	Asia-Pacific	Rebellion suppressed
1830–1831	November Uprising	Poland	Russia	Europe	Uprising suppressed; liquidation of autonomy of Congress Poland
1830–1839	Belgian Revolution	Belgium	Netherlands	Europe	Independence of Belgium from the Netherlands
1830–1875	French pacification of Algeria	Emirate of Mascara; Beylik of Constantine; Sultanate of Beni Abbas	France	Middle East and North Africa	Algerian genocide
1833	Anastasio Aquino's rebellion	Nonualco	Federal Republic of Central America	Americas	Rebellion suppressed
1834–1835	Ja Thak Wa uprising	Champa	Vietnam	Asia-Pacific	Uprising suppressed
1835–1836	Texas Revolution	Texas	Mexico	Americas	De facto independence of Texas from Mexico
1835–1845	Ragamuffin War	Riograndense Republic; Juliana Republic	Brazil	Americas	Juliana and Riograndense defeated and reintegrated into Brazil
1836	Battle of Gawakuke	Gobir	Sokoto Caliphate	Sub-Saharan Africa	Defeat of Hausa insurgents
1836–1839	War of the Confederation	Peru	Peru–Bolivian Confederation	Americas	Restoration of Peruvian independence; dissolution of the Peru–Bolivian Confederation
1837–1838	Rebellions in Upper and Lower Canada	Republic of Lower Canada; Republic of Canada	Britain	Americas	Rebellions suppressed; unification of Upper Canada and Lower Canada into the Province of Canada
1838–1840	Second Central American Civil War	Guatemala; Nicaragua; Honduras	Federal Republic of Central America	Americas	Dissolution of the Federal Republic of Central America
1840–1841	Cambodian Uprising	Cambodia	Vietnam	Asia-Pacific	Liberation of Cambodia from Viet rule; beginning of the Siamese–Vietnamese War of 1840–1845
1844–1847	Franco-Tahitian War	Tahiti; Huahine; Raiatea; Bora Bora	France	Asia-Pacific	Tahiti under French protection; Huahine, Raiatea, and Bora Bora retain independence
1844–1856	Dominican War of Independence	Dominican Republic	Haiti	Americas	Independence of the Dominican Republic from Haiti
1845–1872	New Zealand Wars	Kīngitanga	Britain	Asia-Pacific	Defeat of Māori Iwi; New Zealand land confiscations
1846	Kraków Uprising	Poland	Austria	Europe	Uprising suppressed; Kraków annexed by Austria
1847–1915	Caste War of Yucatán	Chan Santa Cruz	Mexico	Americas	De facto independence of the Maya state in 1849; reconquest by Mexico in 1901
1848	Matale rebellion	Sri Lanka	Britain	Asia-Pacific	Rebellion suppressed
1848	Poznań Uprising	Poland	Prussia	Europe	Uprising suppressed; transition of Posen from a grand duchy to a province
1848–1849	Hungarian Revolution of 1848	Hungary	Austria	Europe	Revolution suppressed; beginning of Hungarian passive resistance
1848–1849	Second Anglo-Sikh War	Sikh Empire	Britain	Asia-Pacific	Fall of the Sikh Empire; British annexation of Punjab
1855–1856	Santhal rebellion	Santal	Britain	Asia-Pacific	Rebellion suppressed; consolidation of British rule in Santal Parganas
1856–1873	Panthay Rebellion	Dali sultanate	Qing Empire	Asia-Pacific	Defeat of Chinese Muslim insurgents
1857–1858	Great Indian Mutiny	Mughal Empire	Britain	Asia-Pacific	Fall of the Mughal Empire; transfer of East India Company's power over India to the British Crown
1861–1865	American Civil War	Confederate States	United States	Americas	Dissolution of the Confederacy; reintegration of the Confederate states into the United States
1862–1877	Tongzhi Hui Revolt	Yettishar	Qing Empire	Asia-Pacific	East Turkestan reconquered by the Qing Empire
1863–1865	January Uprising	Poland	Russia	Europe	Uprising suppressed
1863–1865	Dominican Restoration War	Dominican Republic	Spain	Americas	Restoration of Dominican independence from Spanish occupation
1866	Lykhny revolt	Abkhazia	Russia	Europe	Revolt suppressed
1868	Lares revolt	Republic of Puerto Rico	Spain	Americas	Revolt suppressed
1868–1878	Ten Years' War	Republic of Cuba in Arms	Spain	Americas	Revolt suppressed
1871	Rakovica revolt	Croatian People's Government	Austria-Hungary	Europe	Revolt suppressed
1875–1877	Perak War	Perak	Britain	Asia-Pacific	Revolt suppressed
1875–1914	Acehnese resistance to Dutch rule (Note: Part of the Aceh War)	Aceh Sultanate	Netherlands	Asia-Pacific	Aceh defeated and annexed into Dutch East Indies
1876	Second Colo War	Fijian tribes	Britain	Asia-Pacific	Revolt suppressed; beginning of the Tuka Movement
1876	April Uprising	Bulgarian Revolutionary Central Committee	Ottoman Empire	Europe	Batak massacre; uprising suppressed; Constantinople Conference
1876–1878	Serbian Wars of Independence	Serbia	Ottoman Empire	Europe	Independence of Serbia from the Ottoman Empire
1877–1878	Romanian War of Independence	Romania	Ottoman Empire	Europe	Independence of Romania from the Ottoman Empire
1879–1880	Uprising of Sheikh Ubeydullah	Kurdistan	Ottoman Empire; Qajar Iran	Middle East and North Africa	Uprising suppressed
1880–1881	First Boer War	South African Republic	Britain	Sub-Saharan Africa	Restoration of the South African Republic
1881–1899	Mahdist War	Mahdist State	Egypt (1881–1882); Britain (1882–1899)	Middle East and North Africa	Defeat of Sudanese insurgents; establishment of Anglo-Egyptian Sudan
1885	Jambi uprising	Jambi Sultanate	Netherlands	Asia-Pacific	Uprising suppressed
1885–1896	Cần Vương movement	Vietnam	France	Asia-Pacific	Movement defeated
1887–1897	Leewards War	Huahine; Raiatea; Bora Bora	France	Asia-Pacific	Defeat of Tahitian insurgents; annexation of the Leeward Islands into French Polynesia
1888	Cilegon War^{[id]}	Banten	Netherlands	Asia-Pacific	Revolt suppressed
1890–1895	Lushai Rising	Mizo chiefdoms	Britain	Asia-Pacific	Revolts suppressed
1891–1895	Pahang Uprising	Pahang	Britain	Asia-Pacific	Uprising suppressed
1893	Battle of Al Wajbah	Qatar	Ottoman Empire	Middle East and North Africa	Autonomy granted to Qatar
1895	Taiwanese resistance to Japanese invasion	Formosan Republic (Note: Founded by Taiwanese gentry and Qing local officials in opposition to the cession of Taiwan)	Imperial Japan	Asia-Pacific	Defeat of Taiwanese militia; Japanese annexation of Taiwan
1895–1898	Cuban War of Independence	Cuba	Spain	Americas	Independence of Cuba from Spain after 4 years of American occupation
1895–1903	Menalamba rebellion	Imerina	France	Sub-Saharan Africa	Rebellion suppressed; consolidation of French rule in Madagascar
1896–1897	Second Matabele War	Mthwakazi	Britain	Sub-Saharan Africa	Revolt suppressed
1896–1898	Philippine Revolution	Philippines	Spain	Asia-Pacific	Creation of the First Philippine Republic; beginning of the Philippine–American War
1897–1902	Mutapa restoration movement	Mutapa Empire	Portugal	Sub-Saharan Africa	Movement defeated
1898	Hut Tax War	Temne, Mende	Britain	Sub-Saharan Africa	Rebellions suppressed
1899–1900	Rebellion of Birsa Munda	Munda, Oraon	Britain	Asia-Pacific	Rebellion suppressed
1899–1902	Philippine–American War	Philippines	United States	Asia-Pacific	Philippines defeated and annexed by the United States
1899–1920	Dervish War	Dervish State	Britain; Italy; Ethiopia	Sub-Saharan Africa	Defeat of Somali insurgents
1900	War of the Golden Stool	Asante Empire	Britain	Sub-Saharan Africa	Asante defeated and annexed into British Gold Coast
1901–1936	Holy Man's Rebellion	Lao Theung	France	Asia-Pacific	Rebellion suppressed
1902–1904	Ngiao rebellion	Lanna; Shan; Phrae	Thailand	Asia-Pacific	Rebellion suppressed; consolidation of Siamese rule in Northern Thailand
1902–1913	Moro Rebellion	Sulu Sultanate	United States	Asia-Pacific	Rebellion suppressed
1903	Ilinden–Preobrazhenie Uprising	Kruševo Republic; Strandzha Commune	Ottoman Empire	Europe	Defeat of Macedonian and Bulgarian insurgents
1904–1908	Herero uprising	Herero, Nama	Germany	Sub-Saharan Africa	Herero and Nama genocide
1905–1907	Maji Maji Rebellion	Matumbi, Ngindo, Ngoni, Yao	Germany	Sub-Saharan Africa	Rebellion suppressed
1905–1909	Korean resistance to Japanese annexation	Righteous armies	Imperial Japan	Asia-Pacific	Defeat of Korean militia; fall of the Korean Empire; Japanese annexation of Korea
1906	Bambatha Rebellion	Zululand	Britain	Sub-Saharan Africa	Rebellion suppressed
1910	Bastar rebellion	Bastar	Britain	Asia-Pacific	Rebellion suppressed
1911–1912	Manufahi rebellion	Timorese kingdoms	Portugal	Asia-Pacific	Rebellion suppressed
1912	Battle of Khovd	Mongolia	Qing Empire; China	Asia-Pacific	Liberation of Outer Mongolia from Qing rule; de facto independence of Outer Mongolia from China
1912	Tibetan expulsion of the Han force	Tibet	Qing Empire; China	Asia-Pacific	Liberation of Tibet from Qing rule; de facto independence of Tibet from China
1912	Battle of Sidi Bou Othman	Blue Men of Morocco	France	Middle East and North Africa	Movement defeated
1914–1915	Rundum Rebellion	Murut	Britain	Asia-Pacific	Rebellion suppressed
1914–1915	Maritz rebellion	Transvaal Republic	South Africa	Sub-Saharan Africa	Defeat of Boer insurgents; occupation of German South West Africa by South Africa
1914–1918	Czechoslovak Legion's involvement in World War I	Czechoslovakia	Austria-Hungary	Europe	Independence of Czechoslovakia from Austria-Hungary
1914–1918	Assyrian volunteers' involvement in World War I	Assyria	Ottoman Empire; Qajar Iran	Middle East and North Africa	Assyrian genocide; the Allies' breach of the promise to establish an independent Assyrian state
1915	Kelantan rebellion	Kelantan	Britain	Asia-Pacific	Rebellion suppressed
1915	Tapani uprising	Da Ming Cibeiguo	Imperial Japan	Asia-Pacific	Defeat of Han Taiwanese insurgents
1915–1920	Haitian resistance to U.S. occupation	Cacos	United States	Americas	Revolts suppressed
1916–1917	Kaocen revolt	Tuareg	France	Sub-Saharan Africa	Revolt suppressed
1916–1918	Arab Revolt	Hejaz	Ottoman Empire	Middle East and North Africa	Independence of Hejaz from the Ottoman Empire; partition of the Ottoman Empire
1916–1921	Irish Revolution	Irish Republic	Britain	Europe	Anglo-Irish Treaty: establishment of the Irish Free State; partition of Ireland
1916–1934	Basmachi movement	Turkestan	Soviet Russia (1917–1922); Soviet Union (1922–1934)	Asia-Pacific	Movement defeated; consolidation of Soviet rule in Central Asia
1917–1918	Thái Nguyên uprising	Restoration League of Vietnam	France	Asia-Pacific	Revolt suppressed
1917–1919	Kuki Rebellion	Kuki-Zo	Britain	Asia-Pacific	Rebellion suppressed
1917–1920	North Caucasian independence movement	Mountain Republic (1917–1919); North Caucasian Emirate (1919–1920)	Russian State; Soviet Russia	Europe	Movement defeated; North Caucasus annexed by Soviet Russia
1917–1921	Ukrainian War of Independence	Ukraine	Soviet Russia; Poland; Romania	Europe	Independence of Ukraine from Russia; partition of Ukraine by the Soviet Union and Poland; Khotyn Uprising suppressed by Romania
1917–1922	Dominican resistance to U.S. occupation	Gavilleros	United States	Americas	Revolt suppressed
1918–1920	Estonian War of Independence	Estonia	Soviet Russia	Europe	Independence of Estonia from Russia
1918–1920	Latvian War of Independence	Latvia	Soviet Russia	Europe	Independence of Latvia from Russia
1918–1920	Lithuanian Wars of Independence	Lithuania	Soviet Russia; Poland	Europe	Independence of Lithuania from Russia and Poland
1918–1921	Vue Pa Chay's revolt	Hmong	France	Asia-Pacific	Revolt suppressed
1919	Christmas Uprising	Montenegrin Greens	Yugoslavia	Europe	Uprising suppressed; Montenegro annexed into Yugoslavia
1919	Third Anglo-Afghan War	Afghanistan	Britain	Asia-Pacific	Restoration of Afghan independence from British suzerainty
1919–1923	Turkish War of Independence	Turkey	Greece; France; Britain; Armenia; Georgia	Europe	Creation of the Republic of Turkey; fall of the Ottoman Empire; replacement of the Treaty of Sèvres by the Treaty of Lausanne
1919–1924	Mahmud Barzanji revolts	Kurdish state (1919); Kingdom of Kurdistan (1921–1924)	Britain: Iraq	Middle East and North Africa	Revolts suppressed
1919–1945	Korean armed resistance to Japanese rule	Korean independence activist organizations	Imperial Japan	Asia-Pacific	Restoration of Korean independence from Japan; beginning of the Allied military administration in Korea
1920	Franco-Syrian War	Arab Kingdom of Syria	France	Middle East and North Africa	Disestablishment of the Arab Kingdom of Syria; establishment of French Syria
1920	Iraqi Revolt	Iraq	Britain	Middle East and North Africa	Anglo-Iraqi Treaty of 1922: establishment of the Mandatory Iraqi Kingdom
1920	Ganja revolt	Azerbaijan	Soviet Russia	Europe	Revolt suppressed
1920	Slutsk uprising	Belarus	Soviet Russia	Europe	Uprising suppressed
1920	Croatian Peasant Rebellion	Croatian People's Peasant Party	Yugoslavia	Europe	Rebellion suppressed
1920–1926	Rif War	Rif Republic	Spain	Middle East and North Africa	Disestablishment of the Rif Republic; consolidation of Spanish rule in northern Morocco
1921	February Uprising	Mountainous Armenia	Soviet Russia	Europe	Uprising suppressed
1921	Mongolian People's Revolution	Mongolia	China	Asia-Pacific	Restoration of Outer Mongolian independence from Chinese occupation; foundation of the Mongolian People's Republic
1921–1922	Malabar rebellion	Malayala Rajyam	Britain	Asia-Pacific	Rebellion suppressed
1922–1924	Manyam Rebellion	Vizagapatam Hill tribes	Britain	Asia-Pacific	Rebellion suppressed
1923–1932	Second Italo-Senussi War	Sanusiyya	Fascist Italy	Middle East and North Africa	Libyan genocide
1924	August Uprising	Committee for the Independence of Georgia	Soviet Union	Europe	Uprising suppressed
1924–1925	Tungus Uprising^{[ru]}	Tungus Republic	Soviet Union	Asia-Pacific	Disestablishment of the Tungus Republic
1925	San Blas Rebellion	Republic of Tule	Panama	Americas	Autonomy granted to Guna Yala
1925–1927	Great Syrian Revolt	Syria	France	Middle East and North Africa	Establishment of the Mandatory Syrian Republic
1927–1931	Ararat rebellion	Republic of Ararat	Turkey	Middle East and North Africa	Defeat of Kurdish insurgents
1927–1933	Nicaraguan resistance to U.S. occupation	Sandinistas	United States	Americas	U.S. withdrawal from Nicaragua
1930	Wushe Rebellion	Seediq	Imperial Japan	Asia-Pacific	Rebellion suppressed
1930	Yên Bái mutiny	Vietnam Nationalist Party	France	Asia-Pacific	Revolt suppressed
1930–1931	Galon Rebellion	Myanmar	Britain	Asia-Pacific	Rebellion suppressed
1931–1934	Kumul Rebellion	East Turkestan	China	Asia-Pacific	Rebellion suppressed
1936–1939	Great Palestinian Revolt	Arab Higher Committee	Britain	Middle East and North Africa	Revolt suppressed
1936–1941	Ethiopian resistance to Italian occupation	Ethiopia	Fascist Italy	Sub-Saharan Africa	Restoration of Ethiopian independence from Italian occupation after 3 years of British administration
1939	Hungarian invasion of Carpatho-Ukraine	Carpatho-Ukraine (Note: Proclaiming independence during the invasion by Hungary)	Hungary	Europe	Carpatho-Ukraine defeated and annexed by Hungary
1939–1945	Polish resistance movement in World War II	Polish Underground State; People's Guard	Nazi Germany	Europe	Restoration of Polish sovereignty from German and Soviet occupation; establishment of the Provisional Government of National Unity
1940–1944	Rebellion of Hasan Israilov	Provisional Popular Revolutionary Government of Chechnya-Ingushetia	USSR	Europe	Insurgency suppressed; deportation of the Chechens and Ingushes to Central Asia
1941–1945	Yugoslav National Liberation War	Yugoslavia	Nazi Germany; Fascist Italy; Hungary; Bulgaria	Europe	Restoration of Yugoslav sovereignty from Axis occupation; creation of the Socialist Federal Republic of Yugoslavia
1942	Burmese Army's involvement in Japanese invasion of Myanmar	State of Burma	Britain	Asia-Pacific	Creation of the State of Burma under Japanese occupation
1942–1944	Albanian National Liberation Movement	Albania	Fascist Italy (1942–1943); Nazi Germany (1943–1944)	Europe	Restoration of Albanian sovereignty from Axis occupation; creation of the People's Republic of Albania
1944–1945	Indian National Army's involvement in Japanese invasion of India	Azad Hind	Britain	Asia-Pacific	Surrender of INA to the Allies; Red Fort trials
1944–1946	Ili Rebellion	East Turkestan	China	Asia-Pacific	Establishment of the Coalition Government of Xinjiang Province
1944–1948	Jewish insurgency in Mandatory Palestine	Jewish Resistance Movement	Britain	Middle East and North Africa	British withdrawal from Palestine; beginning of the civil war in Mandatory Palestine
1944–1956	Guerrilla war in the Baltic states	Lithuanian partisans Latvian partisans Estonian partisans	Soviet Union	Europe	March deportation; defeat of Forest Brothers
1944–1960	Anti-Soviet resistance by the UPA	Ukrainian Insurgent Army	Soviet Union	Europe	Insurgency suppressed
1945	Burmese Army's resistance to Japanese occupation	Patriotic Burmese Forces	Imperial Japan	Asia-Pacific	Myanmar returns to British rule and later becomes independent
1945	August Revolution	(Vietnam) Viet Minh	Imperial Japan	Asia-Pacific	Creation of the Democratic Republic of Vietnam; beginning of the First Indochina War

=== Contemporary (1945–present) ===
Dates	Name	Independence side	Anti-independence state	Region	Result
1945–1949	Indonesian National Revolution	Indonesia	Netherlands	Asia-Pacific	Independence of Indonesia from the Netherlands
1945–1952	Crusader Rebellion	Crusaders	Yugoslavia	Europe	Rebellion suppressed
1946–1954	First Indochina War	(Vietnam) Viet Minh (Laos) Pathet Lao (Cambodia) United Issarak Front	France	Asia-Pacific	Independence of Vietnam, Laos, and Cambodia from France; partition of Vietnam
1947–1949	Malagasy Uprising	Madagascar	France	Sub-Saharan Africa	Uprising suppressed
1948–1949	First Arab–Israeli War (Note: Part of the 1948 Palestine war)	Israel	Arab League	Middle East and North Africa	Creation of the State of Israel; establishment of the Egyptian-controlled All-Palestine Protectorate over Gaza; Jordanian annexation of the West Bank
1948–1960	Malayan Emergency	Malayan Communist Party	Britain	Asia-Pacific	Communist insurgency continues after Malayan independence from Britain in 1957
1948–present	Insurgency in Balochistan	Kalat (1948–1960); Balochistan Liberation Front (1964–present)	Pakistan; Iran	Asia-Pacific	Ongoing
1950–1954	Puerto Rican Nationalist Party insurgency	Nationalist Party of Puerto Rico	United States	Americas	Insurgency suppressed
1950–1963	Ambonese resistance to Indonesian rule	South Moluccas	Indonesia	Asia-Pacific	South Moluccas defeated and annexed by Indonesia
1952–1960	Mau Mau rebellion	Kenya Land and Freedom Army	Britain	Sub-Saharan Africa	Rebellion suppressed
1954–1962	Algerian War	Algeria	France	Middle East and North Africa	Independence of Algeria from France
1954–present	Insurgency in Northeast India	Separatist groups in Northeast India	India	Asia-Pacific	Ongoing as low-level conflict
1955–1959	Greek Cypriot War of Independence	Cyprus	Britain	Europe	Independence of Cyprus from Britain
1955–2005	South Sudanese wars of independence	South Sudan	Sudan	Sub-Saharan Africa	Independence of South Sudan from Sudan after 6 years of autonomy
1957–1959	Omani Imamate's resistance to Muscati annexation (Note: Part of the Jebel Akhdar War)	Imamate of Oman	Muscat and Oman	Middle East and North Africa	Fall of the Imamate of Oman
1959	Tibetan Uprising	Tibet	China	Asia-Pacific	Uprising suppressed; abolition of the Tibetan Government; Tibetan diaspora
1959–2011	Basque conflict	Basque National Liberation Movement	Spain; France	Europe	Dissolution of ETA
1960–1963	Katanga and South Kasai secessions (Note: Part of the Congo Crisis)	Katanga; South Kasai	DR Congo	Sub-Saharan Africa	Katanga and South Kasai defeated and reintegrated into DR Congo; beginning of the Katanga insurgency
1961–1963	Aden Emergency	South Yemen	Britain	Middle East and North Africa	Independence of South Yemen from Britain
1961–1974	Angolan War of Independence	Angola	Portugal	Sub-Saharan Africa	Independence of Angola from Portugal
1961–1991	Eritrean War of Independence	Eritrea	Ethiopia	Sub-Saharan Africa	Independence of Eritrea from Ethiopia
1962	Brunei revolt	North Kalimantan National Army	Britain	Asia-Pacific	Revolt suppressed; abstention of Brunei from joining Malaysia
1962–1982	Rwenzururu movement	Rwenzururu	Uganda	Sub-Saharan Africa	Autonomy granted to Rwenzururu
1962–1990	Communist insurgency in Sarawak	North Kalimantan Communist Party	Britain (1962–1963); Malaysia (1963–1990)	Asia-Pacific	Dissolution of NKCP
1962–present	Papua conflict	West Papua	Indonesia	Asia-Pacific	Ongoing
1963–1974	Guinea-Bissau War of Independence	Guinea-Bissau	Portugal	Sub-Saharan Africa	Independence of Guinea-Bissau from Portugal
1963–present	Katanga insurgency	Congolese National Liberation Front (1967–1991); Mai-Mai Kata Katanga (2011–present)	DR Congo	Sub-Saharan Africa	Ongoing
1964–1974	Mozambican War of Independence	Mozambique	Portugal	Sub-Saharan Africa	Independence of Mozambique from Portugal
1966–1988	South African Border War	Namibia	South Africa	Sub-Saharan Africa	Independence of Namibia from South Africa
1967–1970	Nigerian Civil War	Biafra	Nigeria	Sub-Saharan Africa	Blockade of Biafra; Biafra defeated and reintegrated into Nigeria
1968–2019	Moro conflict	Moro Islamic Liberation Front	Philippines	Asia-Pacific	Autonomy granted to Bangsamoro
1970–present	Western Sahara conflict	Sahrawi Republic	Spain (1970–1975); Mauritania (1975–1979); Morocco (1975–present)	Middle East and North Africa	Ongoing as two thirds of Western Sahara occupied by Morocco
1971	Bangladesh Liberation War	Bangladesh	Pakistan	Asia-Pacific	Independence of Bangladesh from Pakistan
1973–present	Oromo conflict	Oromo Liberation Front	Ethiopia	Sub-Saharan Africa	Ongoing
1974	Cyprus Peace Operation	Northern Cyprus	Cyprus	Europe	De facto independence of Northern Cyprus; partition of Cyprus
1975–1978	Indonesian invasion of East Timor (Note: In response to the establishment of the Democratic Republic of East Timor)	Timor-Leste	Indonesia	Asia-Pacific	Timor-Leste defeated and annexed by Indonesia; East Timor genocide
1975–present	Cabinda War	Cabinda	Angola	Sub-Saharan Africa	Ongoing
1976–2005	Insurgency in Aceh	Free Aceh Movement	Indonesia	Asia-Pacific	Autonomy granted to Aceh
1976–present	Corsican conflict	National Liberation Front of Corsica	France	Europe	Ongoing as low-level conflict
1978–2025	Kurdistan Workers' Party insurgency	Kurdistan Communities Union	Turkey	Middle East and North Africa	Kurdish villages depopulated by Turkey; dissolution of PKK
1979–1983	Kurdish rebellion in Iran (Note: Part of the aftermath of the Iranian Revolution)	Democratic Party of Iranian Kurdistan	Iran	Middle East and North Africa	Rebellion suppressed
1979–1989	Soviet–Afghan War	Afghan mujahideen	Soviet Union	Asia-Pacific	Soviet withdrawal from Afghanistan; beginning of the Afghan Civil War
1979–1991	Cambodian resistance to Vietnamese occupation (Note: Part of the Cambodian–Vietnamese War and the Third Indochina War)	Coalition Government of Democratic Kampuchea	Vietnam	Asia-Pacific	Vietnamese withdrawal from Cambodia; Cambodia under UN administration; restart of the Khmer Rouge insurgency in 1993
1981–1991	Somaliland War of Independence	Somaliland	Somalia	Sub-Saharan Africa	De facto independence of Somaliland from Somalia
1982–present	Casamance conflict	Movement of Democratic Forces of Casamance	Senegal	Sub-Saharan Africa	Ongoing as low-level conflict
1983–2009	Sri Lankan civil war	Tamil Eelam	Sri Lanka	Asia-Pacific	Tamil genocide; dissolution of LTTE
1984–1995	Insurgency in Punjab	Khalistan	India	Asia-Pacific	1984 Sikh massacre; insurgency suppressed
1988–1998	Bougainville conflict	Bougainville Revolutionary Army	Papua New Guinea	Asia-Pacific	Establishment of the Autonomous Region of Bougainville in 2002; referendum in favor of independence in 2019
1988–2023	Nagorno-Karabakh conflict	Artsakh	Azerbaijan	Europe	De facto independence of Artsakh in 1991; disestablishment of the Republic of Artsakh in 2023; expulsion of Nagorno-Karabakh Armenians
1989–present	Insurgency in Jammu and Kashmir	All Parties Hurriyat Conference	India	Asia-Pacific	Ongoing
1990	Barin uprising	East Turkestan	China	Asia-Pacific	Uprising suppressed
1990–1992	Transnistrian War	Transnistria	Moldova	Europe	De facto independence of Transnistria from Moldova
1991	Liberation of Kuwait campaign (Note: Part of the Gulf War)	Kuwait	Iraq	Middle East and North Africa	Restoration of Kuwaiti independence from Iraqi occupation
1991	Ten-Day War	Slovenia	Yugoslavia	Europe	Independence of Slovenia from Yugoslavia
1991–1992	South Ossetia War	South Ossetia	Georgia	Europe	De facto independence of South Ossetia from Georgia
1991–1995	Croatian War of Independence	Croatia	Yugoslavia	Europe	Independence of Croatia from Yugoslavia
1992–1993	War in Abkhazia	Abkhazia	Georgia	Europe	De facto independence of Abkhazia from Georgia
1994–2009	Chechen Wars	Ichkeria	Russia	Europe	De facto independence of Ichkeria in 1991; disestablishment of the Chechen Republic of Ichkeria in 2000; beginning of the insurgency in the North Caucasus
1998–1999	Kosovo War	Kosova	Yugoslavia	Europe	Independence of Kosovo from Serbia after 9 years of UN administration
2001–2021	Taliban insurgency	Islamic Emirate of Afghanistan	United States	Asia-Pacific	U.S. withdrawal from Afghanistan; restoration of the Taliban government
2003–2011	Iraqi insurgency	Naqshbandi Army; Islamic Army; Mahdi Army	United States	Middle East and North Africa	U.S. withdrawal from Iraq; beginning of the 2013–2017 War in Iraq
2006–present	Insurgency in Bakassi	Bakassi Movement for Self-Determination (2006–2018); Biafra Nations League (2021–present)	Cameroon; Nigeria	Sub-Saharan Africa	Ongoing
2012	Tuareg rebellion (Note: Part of the Mali War)	Azawad	Mali	Sub-Saharan Africa	Azawadi unrecognized independence renounced in 2013
2017–2026	Southern Transitional Council conflict (Note: Part of the Yemeni Civil War)	Southern Transitional Council	Yemen	Middle East and North Africa	Dissolution of STC
2017–present	Anglophone Crisis	Ambazonia	Cameroon	Sub-Saharan Africa	Ongoing
2020–present	Western Togoland Rebellion	Western Togoland	Ghana	Sub-Saharan Africa	Ongoing

== See also ==
- War of independence
- Resistance during World War II
- Lists of active separatist movements
- List of revolutions and rebellions
- Lists of wars
  - List of non-international armed conflicts
