= Chechen Revolutionary Detachment =

Chechen faction during World War II

Provisional Popular Revolutionary Government of Chechnya-Ingushetia
- Leaders: Hasan Israilov; Mairbek Sheripov
- Country: Checheno-Ingush ASSR
- Allegiance: Checheno-Ingush ASSR
- Ideology: Anti-Sovietism; Chechen Nationalism
- Size: 5,000+ 25,000 sympathizers
- Wars: World War Two; 1940-1944 Insurgency in Chechnya

The Provisional Popular Revolutionary Government of Chechnya-Ingushetia was a faction led by Hasan Israilov and Mairbek Sheripov allied with Germany and fighting against the Soviet Union during the Second World War.

== History ==
The Faction was established in the Chechen village of Galanchozh by Israilov and his brother Hussein. After the Soviets failed to capture Finland, Israilov became more convinced to start a war liberation group and started one with his brother Hussein, establishing a guerilla base in south-eastern Chechnya. There, they organized a guerilla movement, preparing an uprising against the Soviets. In the early 1940s, the liberation movement captured several villages in Chechnya.

=== German invasion ===
In June 1941, the Germans invaded the Soviet Union, aiming to eliminate them as a potential threat to the Reich, also having the dual purpose of forcing the United Kingdom to sue for peace. Hasan and his brother started recruiting locals, calling their movement: "Provisional Popular Revolutionary Government of Chechen-Ingushetia", reaching 5,000 members and 25,000 sympathizers. In February 1942, Mairbek Sheripov rebelled and took over Itum-Kale while the others took over the villages of Novolakskaya and Dylym, the liberation movement had a approximated number of 62 thousand fighters.

In August 1942, German saboteurs landed in Ingushetia from the Nordkaukasisches Sonderkommando Schamil, where they recruited local Chechen and Ingush civilians. 40 German agents also were dropped where they arrived to take seize Grozny to prevent the Soviets from taking it over and to hold it until the German Panzer army arrived.
