= Kingdom of Talamanca =

Former regional entity of Costa Rica

Kingdom of Talamanca Reino de Talamanca
- 1867–1910
- Government: Cacicazgo
- History
  - Presidential decree: July 25 1867
  - King Santiago Mayas: 1862-1871
  - King Birche: 1872-1874
  - King William Forbes: 1872-1880
  - King Antonio Saldaña: 1880-1910
  - Last king and heir's deaths: 1910
Preceded by	Succeeded by
Cacicazgo of Talamanca	Limón Province
- Today part of: Costa Rica: ∟Limón

The Kingdom of Talamanca was a political entity existing during the historic period covered from the Executive Decree issued by the Costa Rican government on July 25, 1867, recognizing the Talamanca indigenous monarchs as "political chiefs" of the region, until the death of their last king Antonio Saldaña in 1910, apparently poisoned, and who died without heirs thus putting an end to the line of succession.

== History ==
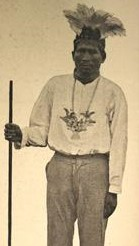
Antonio Saldaña, the final king of Talamanca

The region of Talamanca was populated mainly by natives of the Bribris, Cabécares, Teribes, Changuinolas and Borucas ethnic groups and was never completely defeated by the Spanish conquerors. That is why the political dominance of the Costa Rican central government was little more than symbolic. Successive indigenous revolts happened in the area including those of the terbis (1544), chánguinas (1610), urinamas (1678) and tariacas (1709). The most notorious would be that led by the cacique Pablo Presbere executed by the Spaniards on July 4, 1710 in Cartago.

By 1862 there were three indigenous kings in the Talamanca Mountains; Chirimo, Lapis and Santiago Mayas, who were recognized as political leaders officially by executive decree on July 25. Mayas' cousin William Forbes, alias "King Willie" and Birche would take over after the death of Lapis. They ruled over a population of approximately 3,000 natives, mostly Bribris and Cabécares. Birche would be dismissed by the governor of Limón for alleged abuses of power in 1874, the crown falling entirely on Forbes, although at this point his leadership was symbolic because the de facto governor was the US Marine John H. Lyon, married to an indigenous noble woman and who held the official position of regent or reductor of Talamanca. Forbes led an indigenous revolt against the political authorities that would lead to be declared in absentia by the central government, he was accused of murder and dismissed by the governor of Limón thus his position was granted to his nephew Antonio Saldaña on May 23, 1880. On July 4, 1890, he was granted an official salary for "services provided to the San Bernardo de Talamanca neighborhood" of 40 pesos per month. Saldaña had an ambivalent attitude toward the Costa Rican government, on the one hand opposing the sending of teachers and the military service of indigenous people, and on the other requiring President Cleto González Víquez greater investment and development in the area. He opposed the intervention of the United Fruit Company in his fief with, according to oral tradition, sabotage to plantations and railroads.

Saldaña held the crown for three decades, although more as a decorative figure than a political one, however his moral weight allowed him to exert influence over the indigenous settlers and his opposition to the exploitation of the United Fruit Company in the area earned him powerful enemies. He died almost at the same time as his nephew and heir José according to the Bribri (matrilineal) tradition. It is suspected that both poisoned. Although his second nephew Ramón Almengor (Siarke) claimed the title was only recognized by the bribris. The end of the lineage that ended with the Blu caste or Bribri royal caste was a cultural blow so the kingdom as such came to an end and the territory would be fully integrated into the rest of the country.
