= Antonio Saldaña =

Costa Rican politician

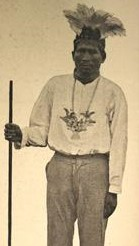

King of Talamanca
- Reign: 1880 - 3 January 1910
- Predecessor: William Forbes
- Successor: Siarke (bribris only)
- Born: Talamanca, Costa Rica
- Died: 3 January 1910; Talamanca, Costa Rica
- Clan: Salwak
- Religion: Bribri religion

Antonio Saldaña was a Bribri cacique and the last king of Talamanca in Costa Rica.

Belonging to the clan Salwak ("owners of the red monkey"), succeeded his predecessor William Forbes, in 1880. Saldaña was the king of bribris, cabécares, teribes, changuinolas and borucas. It was recognized by around 3,200 Indians and by the government of Costa Rica that since 1867 had declared the kings of Talamanca as political leaders of the area. He was the maternal nephew of Santiago Mayas, had three sisters and also had three wives named Oleria, Leonor Almengor and Aurelia Cuéllar, since polygamy was common among the Bribris at the time. In 1882, the Swedish traveler Carl Bovallius described Saldaña as a young and well-developed Indian of 1.80 m. He dressed in a simple way, but he differed from the others by wearing his gold insignia and the chieftain's baton.

He opposed the banana exploitation of the United Fruit Company (UFCO) on their land, as well as the intervention of whites in indigenous education and culture. He also frequently appealed to the government for help.

Antonio Saldaña died on January 3, 1910, with his nephew José, who was to succeed him, thus putting an end to the Bribri dynasty. It is suspected that he died poisoned, some accusations suggest that he was poisoned by the UFCO banana company for his opposition to it.

His minor nephew, Ramón Almengor, claimed the title but was not recognized by the Costa Rican government or by any indigenous ethnic group except the Bribris, and died of tuberculosis on January 28, 1922, at the San Juan de Dios Hospital in San José. Because the inheritance among the bribris is matrilineal, the successor had to be the eldest son of the king's elder sister, and since Ramon's sisters had no sons the royal line was considered lost.
