= William Forbes (Talamancan king) =

Indigenous king of Talamanca in Costa Rica

King of Talamanca
- Reign: January 1872 - September 1874 (as co-monarch with Birche); September 1874 - May 1880 (as sole monarch)
- Predecessor: Birche
- Successor: Antonio Saldaña
- Co-monarch: Birche (until 1874)
- Born: Costa Rica
- Died: Costa Rica

William Forbes, known as "King Willie" was an Indigenous king of Talamanca, in Costa Rica, belonging to the Bribri ethnic group. He was a close relative of King Santiago Mayas, but backed another cousin of his, Lapis, in his failed attempt to overthrow that monarch. Later, he participated in the conspiracy that resulted in the assassination of Mayas in January 1872. When King Birche ascended to power, Forbes was proclaimed as the second chief of the Talamanca Indians.

In September 1874, after the government of Costa Rica suspended King Birche, Forbes became the political leader of Talamanca and king of the indigenous people of the region. Some years later, the discord between him and Birche provoked unrest in Talamanca and the military intervention of Costa Rica, whose authorities backed Forbes. Nevertheless, in May 1880 the monarch committed a murder and was declared in rebellion. A second military intervention by Costa Rica made him flee to Térraba through the Talamanca mountain range and be dismissed as political chief by the Limón authorities. He was succeeded by his nephew Antonio Saldaña, who was the last king of Talamanca.
