= Operation Zeppelin (espionage plan) =

German anti-partisan intelligence operation

Operation Zeppelin (German: Unternehmen Zeppelin) was a top secret German plan to recruit Soviet prisoners of war (POWs) for espionage and sabotage operations behind the Russian front line during World War II. Active from mid-1942 to the end of the war in spring 1945, the operation initially intended to send masses of agents to Soviet Russia to collect military intelligence and to counterbalance sabotage activities carried out by the Soviet partisans. To that end, Germans recruited thousands of Soviet POWs and trained them in special camps. However, this approach had to be abandoned in favor of more targeted operations due to a lack of reliable Soviet recruits and dwindling resources, such as aircraft fuel. Operation Zeppelin was particularly important for intelligence gathering in the Eastern Front, but its more ambitious missions yielded little results. It had some success in the Caucasus where the various peoples of the Caucasus aspired to become independent from the Soviet Union, but other missions, such as sabotage of power plants near Moscow or a plot to assassinate Joseph Stalin, were abandoned or failed. A particular failure was the desertion of the Brigade SS Druzhina in August 1943.

== Origin ==
The operation could be traced to small mobile units (Aussenkommando) of interrogators that worked on the numerous Soviet POWs captured during the Operation Barbarossa. Some prisoners, particularly those that had lost loved ones to Soviet repressions or were not ethnic Russians, were willing to cooperate with the Germans. The idea for a wider operation that would go beyond collection of military intelligence originated from "below" and was brought to the attention of Reinhard Heydrich and Heinrich Himmler. The operation crystallized in summer 1942 despite a March 1942 agreement that defined foreign espionage as an Abwehr function. Operation Zeppelin was supposed to address the lack of intelligence on the Soviet Union (Abwehr's performance was considered abysmal) and to create a counterweight to the expanding Soviet partisan activities.

== Recruits ==
The Germans had little trouble finding recruits as starving and desperate prisoners saw Operation Zeppelin as a chance at survival. However, Germans faced trouble finding qualified recruits. They wanted to recruit educated anti-communists but found that Soviet repressions left only illiterate anti-communists. Selected prisoners were sent to special training camps to learn about sabotage, subversion, radio transmissions, etc. Their ideological training focused on exploiting hatred for "Judeo-Bolshevism". Germans also fanned independence aspirations of the peoples from Caucasus and Central Asia. Prisoners of conflicting political beliefs, for example Ukrainian nationalists and Russian nationalists of the Russian Liberation Army, were kept separate. The recruits wore German uniforms and their living conditions were comparable to those of German soldiers. However, recruits that were deemed unfit were sent to extermination camps. Other Zeppelin agents were executed upon their return after the completion of their missions. For failing to prevent the executions, Walter Schellenberg, chief of the foreign intelligence, was sentenced to six years in prison in the post-war Ministries Trial.

Before 1944, the education lasted from two or three weeks to three months. There was little consistency between the camps as focus was placed on quantity over quality. Due to aircraft shortage, there were significant delays in deployment. Idle agents drank alcohol, contracted venereal diseases, and rethought their allegiance. Zeppelin recruits, who witnessed German atrocities and heard the Untermenschen propaganda, lacked positive inspiration and that led to a high rate of failed missions and frequent defections. In numerous cases, Zeppelin agents would surrender to NKVD and cooperate in fighting the Germans. Soviet sources claim that they were able to turn more than 80, or nearly 13%, of captured radio agents. Further, POW enthusiasm for cooperation dwindled after the German failure in the Battle of Stalingrad.

As a result, the Germans had to abandon the "quantity over quality" approach and become more selective. They chose those Russian prisoners that had committed an unforgivable offense, such as desertion or atrocity against Soviet civilians, that would prevent them from ever surrendering to the Soviet authorities. In January 1944, at a conference in Breslau, Schellenberg ordered that German agents needed to be attached to Russian groups for proper control and supervision. At the end of 1944 and beginning of 1945, Operation Zeppelin faced such difficulties in finding reliable Russian agents that it was decided to use Russian-speaking Volksdeutsche. From mid-1943, Operation Zeppelin also supported and maintained contact with pro-German groups that were left behind the Russian line by the advancing Red Army. For example, in summer 1944, Zeppelin made contact with troops of the S.S. Sturmbrigade R.O.N.A. near Bryansk.

== Structure ==
=== Organization ===
Operation Zeppelin was part of the Section C at the Amt VI (foreign intelligence) of the Reich Security Main Office (RSHA). Under the leadership of Heinz Gräfe, the operation became an independent office of Section C in mid-1943. In its intelligence gathering functions, Operation Zeppelin duplicated the activities of Abwehr, the German military intelligence, and of the Foreign Armies East (FHO), department of the Oberkommando des Heeres (Army high command). While relations with FHO were normal, relations with Abwehr were adversarial. It was one of the manifestations of the continued rivalry between Sicherheitsdienst (SD, the intelligence agency of the SS and the Nazi Party) and Abwehr. Inside RSHA, Operation Zeppelin suffered from a rivalry between Amt IV (the Gestapo) and Amt VI. Towards the end of the war, there were attempts at creating a collaboration between Operation Zeppelin and the Russian Liberation Army.

The relatively small staff at the headquarters in Wannsee were mostly academics from various Ostforschung (German for Research of the East) institutes. To support the operation, the Havel Institute (Havelinstitut) was established in Wannsee by an order of Himmler in September 1942. It was a radio center intended to handle the communications with the deployed agents as well as a training facility for radio operators. Information collected by Zeppelin agents was handed over for processing and assessment to other departments of Section C. Only in summer 1944, Zeppelin headquarters took over the functions of compiling and evaluating the gathered intelligence information. Towards the end of the war, Operation Zeppelin with the rest of Section C was evacuated to the Bavarian Alps.

In the field, agents were attached to Einsatzgruppen. Starting spring 1943, the agents were divided into three Hauptkommandos, each attached to an army group (Army Group North, Army Group Centre, and Army Group South), but reporting directly to the Zeppelin headquarters. Hauptkommando North was headquartered in Pskov and was the strongest. Hauptkommando South, due to Red Army advances, kept moving from Berdiansk to Voznesensk to Odessa to Przemyśl to Hungary where it had to be reorganized. The existence of the Hauptkommando Centre is debated between German and Russian sources; it is possible that the group recruited and trained prisoners but never fully deployed the agents.

=== Auxiliary military units ===
The Hauptkommandos had auxiliary military units where recruits served while waiting for their airdrop behind the Soviet lines. It was also a way for Germans to assess the reliability and readiness of the recruits. Hauptkommando South had two auxiliary companies: a 200-man unit of mainly Georgians and a 350-man unit from Central Asia. The latter was used to guard Hauptkommando camp and headquarters, but they never gained more prominence.

The largest of such auxiliary units was attached to Hauptkommando North. In late 1941 or early 1942, a military group, commanded by Vladimir Gil (codename Rodionov), formed in Stalag I-F in Suwałki. It was a battalion-size unit initially stationed near Pskov. A second such unit was created at the end of 1942 in Stalag 319 near Chełm. The two units were merged in March 1943 to form the Brigade SS Druzhina. They were moved near Hlybokaye in Belarus to engage in anti-partisan operations, including Operation Cottbus in May–June 1943. There were plans of incorporating SS Druzhina into the Russian Liberation Army. However, on 13 August 1943, Gil and his brigade with about 2,500 men killed some 90 German liaison officers and defected to the Soviet side (according to other sources, the defectors numbered only 400 men from the 1st Battalion of the brigade). The defectors formed the 1st Anti-Fascist Brigade that fought the Germans and was destroyed in April 1944 during the anti-partisan Operation Frühlingsfest.

=== Camps ===
The largest training camp of Operation Zeppelin (SS Sonderlager Sandberge) was located in Sandberge, about 1.5 kilometres (0.93 mi) from the train station in Breitenmarkt (Sieraków Śląski). At its peak, it housed some 2,000 agents and was evacuated to Teplá in late 1944. The main training camp of the Hauptkommando North was located in Pskov. Hauptkommando Center had camps in Jabłoń (subordinated to KL Lublin and destroyed in 1942) and Kolín (established towards the end of 1944). Other camps were separated by nationalities. For example, camp in Legionowo new Warsaw housed Turkic peoples that were later sent to the Turkestan Legion. Zeppelin had sections in the major camps as well. For example, it had two barracks inside the Buchenwald concentration camp in 1942 and was present in the Auschwitz concentration camp until early 1944. Likely, these acted as recruiting stations.

Special camps, Sonderlagers "T" and "L", were located in Wrocław (evacuated to Blamau in Reichsgau Niederdonau in early 1944). In Sonderlager "T", Russian scientists and technicians conducted research on technology, such as remote control, that could be incorporated into weapons and prepared mission plans that required technical expertise such as knowledge of Russian oil infrastructure. In Sonderlager "L", about 200 scientists compiled statistics, charts, and maps of Soviet Russia. They produced particularly valuable reports that were hidden in spring 1945 in hopes of offering them to the British or the Americans. It could be considered the most successful aspect of Operation Zeppelin.

== Missions ==
=== Mass deployment ===
Missions commenced in June 1942. Groups, four to five men including a radio operator, were parachuted deep behind the front line while others crossed the front line on the ground. The men were provided with forged identity papers and large sums of cash. Groups were given various tasks of espionage, diversion, sabotage, infiltration, dissemination of propaganda, instigation of resistance, etc. In a short time Germans assembled some 10,000 to 15,000 recruits in training camps and had 2,000 or 3,000 trainees ready for deployment. It is estimated than on any given day there were 500 to 800 Zeppelin agents working inside Soviet Russia between 1942 and 1944. However, according to other sources, Operation Zeppelin and Abwehr did not manage to airdrop more than 1,750 to 2,000 agents combined.

Due to the insurgency in Chechnya, a particularly frequent target was North Caucasus and Transcaucasia, where over the course of the war, Zeppelin and Abwehr's Operation Schamil airdropped more than 50 diversionary groups. However, the results were meager. Many groups were captured or wiped out soon after landing or agreed to cooperate with the Soviets. Amt VI had no way of verifying received information and thus it was highly susceptible to disinformation planted by Soviet security forces. However, much of the information on Zeppelin agent activities and fate comes from Russian sources that were eager to emphasize the diligence and effectiveness of NKVD and other security agencies. Perhaps the most successful operation was sabotage of the Finland Train Station during the Siege of Leningrad. Due to little success and dwindling resources, including shortages of aircraft fuel and radio units, Germans had to abandon the ideas of mass deployment of saboteurs and return to the primary goal of intelligence gathering by March 1943.

=== Intelligence gathering ===
Operation Zeppelin had some successes in gathering intelligence. For example, a three-member team infiltrated the Soviet People's Commissariat of Transport and was able to send reports on Red Army movements. Other agents sent reports on railway movements from Samara and Vladivostok. A lone agent was working at the staff of Marshal Konstantin Rokossovsky, designer of the Operation Bagration. In October 1944, Operation Zeppelin still had 15 teams functioning behind the Soviet lines. Though, as a Zeppelin officer testified after the war, the operation gathered most of its intelligence from simple interrogations of Soviet POWs.

The most successful mission in Transcaucasia was Operation Mainz which involved Georgian émigrés who hoped to restore the Democratic Republic of Georgia. Mikheil Kedia, chief of the Georgian desk at Zeppelin in 1942–1943, approached the Germans with a plan to exploit the open border between Turkey and Soviet Russia near Batumi. Two squads of Georgians were smuggled across the border. They connected with local anti-Soviet underground and established an exchange: weapons and sabotage materials for information. The operation was undertaken with the tacit support from the Turkish intelligence. In spring 1944, Zeppelin expanded the operation by deploying additional five teams in Georgia. However, at the same time, it became almost impossible to maintain contact as Turkey, under increasing pressure from the Allies, broke off relations with Germany in August 1944 and Axis powers withdrew from Greece in October 1944.

=== Other missions ===
Soviet Kombrig Ivan Bessonov was selected as leader for a plan to airdrop saboteurs in Siberia, free GULAG prisoners and German POWs, and launch an anti-Soviet resistance movement (see: GULAG Operation). In October 1942, a special camp was set up to train 200 people and 60 radio operators in Breslau. In early 1943, it was moved to Linsdorf. However, only three groups were dispatched to the Komi ASSR: 12 people on 2 June 1943, 40 people near Syktyvkar at the end of 1943, and 7 people in June 1944. All of these groups were quickly liquidated by the NKVD. Bessonov himself was arrested and sent to the Sachsenhausen concentration camp in June 1943.

In summer 1943, Otto Skorzeny was chosen to lead Operation Ulm. The plan was to drop agents in the Ural Mountains so that they would sabotage Soviet steel industry in Magnitogorsk and Chelyabinsk. The initial plans were modified to target the electrical grid. Operation Zeppelin provided the manpower and selected agents began training, however delays caused by lack of suitable long-range planes meant a loss of launch sites to the advancing Red Army (and increasing the distance planes needed to cover). Only a small group was sent to Vologda against alternate targets. The Operation Ulm transformed into Operation Eisenhammer, a plan for the Luftwaffe to bomb power plants near Moscow. However, there were other more pressing needs and, eventually, Eisenhammer was cancelled.

=== Plot to assassinate Stalin ===
An elaborate plot to assassinate Joseph Stalin in Moscow became the best known mission undertaken by Operation Zeppelin, though details of the events vary as Russian sources have altered the story several times.

In May 1942, a Russian officer by name of Shilo (or Politov or Polikov), deserted to the Germans. He bragged about his Soviet medals and connections with the Russian high command (Stavka). The Russian agent took the name Pyotr Ivanovich Tavrin, assumed the identity of an injured Russian major and underwent extensive training. The plan was to airlift Tavrin and his wife radio/operator Lidia Yakovlevna Shilova to an airfield in the Moscow region. From there, they would travel to Moscow to assassinate Stalin or other high-ranking Soviet officials possibly on 25 October, an anniversary of the October Revolution.

On the night of 3–4 September 1944, an Arado Ar 232B transport plane took off from Riga. Flown by a crew from the secretive Luftwaffe Kampfgeschwader 200, it was hit by Soviet anti-aircraft fire and crash-landed near Smolensk. Russian counter-intelligence found out about the plans and waited for the plane at its intended landing site. Tavrin and his wife took the Russian M-72 motorcycle with sidecar, and rode towards Moscow. They were stopped by a patrol and were arrested as they looked suspiciously dry on a rainy night. The crew of the plane was also arrested and executed in August 1945. Tavrin and his wife, who the Germans hoped to use against the Russians, were executed in March and April 1952 respectively.

== Commanders ==
Operation Zeppelin was commanded by:

- Sturmbannführer Johannes Kleinert, spring 1942 to summer 1942
- Obersturmbannführer Rudolf Oebsger-Röder, summer 1942 to spring 1943
- Standartenführer Heinz Gräfe, spring 1943 to summer 1943
- Sturmbannführer Erich Hengelhaupt, summer 1943 to September 1944
- Standartenführer Karl Tschierschky, September 1944 to November 1944
- Standartenführer Walter H. Rapp, November 1944 to April 1945

== General and cited references ==
- Biddiscombe, Perry (September 2000). "Unternehmen Zeppelin: The Deployment of SS Saboteurs and Spies in the Soviet Union, 1942-1945". Europe-Asia Studies. 6 (52): 1115–1142. doi:10.1080/09668130050143851. ISSN 1465-3427. JSTOR 153592. S2CID 144885216.
- Biddiscombe, Perry (2006). The SS Hunter Battalions: The Hidden History of the Nazi Resistance Movement 1944-45. Tempus. ISBN 9780752439389.
- Birstein, Vadim (2013). Smersh: Stalin's Secret Weapon. Biteback Publishing. ISBN 9781849546898.
- Chuyev, Sergei (2003). Спецслужбы Третьего Рейха (PDF) (in Russian). Vol. 2. Saint Petersburg: Nevag. ISBN 5-94849-466-7.
- Chuyev, Sergei (2004). Проклятые солдаты. Предатели на стороне III рейха (in Russian). Moscow: Eksmo. ISBN 5-699-05970-9.
- Counter Intelligence War Room (28 February 1946). AMT VI of the RSHA Gruppe VI C (PDF). Situation Report. Vol. 8. Central Intelligence Agency. Archived from the original (PDF) on January 23, 2017.
- Doerries, Reinhard R. (2005). Hitler's Last Chief of Foreign Intelligence: Allied Interrogations of Walter Schellenberg. Taylor & Francis. ISBN 0-203-01809-5.
- Doerries, Reinhard R. (2009). Hitler's Intelligence Chief: Walter Schellenberg. Enigma Books. ISBN 978-1-929631-77-3.
- Klei, Alexandra (2011). Der erinnerte Ort: Geschichte durch Architektur. Zur baulichen und gestalterischen Repräsentation der nationalsozialistischen Konzentrationslager (in German). Bielefeld, Germany: transcript Verlag. ISBN 978-3-8376-1733-7.
- Marshall, Alex (2010). The Caucasus Under Soviet Rule. Routledge. ISBN 978-0-203-84700-8.
- Mendelsohn, John, ed. (1978). Nurenberg War Crimes Trials: Records of Case IX, United States of America v. Otto Ohlendorf et al. Special list. Vol. 42. National Archives and Records Service, General Services Administration.
- National Archives and Records Administration (April 2001). "Records of the Central Intelligence Agency (RG 263)". Nazi War Crimes Interagency Working Group.
- Paehler, Katrin (2017). The Third Reich's Intelligence Services: The Career of Walter Schellenberg. Cambridge University Press. ISBN 978-1-107-15719-4.
- Parrish, Michael (2004). Sacrifice of the Generals: Soviet Senior Officer Losses, 1939-1953. Scarecrow Press. ISBN 0-8108-5009-5.
- Price, Alfred (2015). The Last Year of the Luftwaffe: May 1944 to May 1945. Frontline Books. ISBN 978-1-84832-866-2.
- Rein, Leonid (2013). The Kings and the Pawns: Collaboration in Byelorussia During World War II. Berghahn Books. ISBN 978-1-78238-048-1.
- Silver, Arnold M. (6 March 1948). Counterintelligence Special Report 61 (PDF). 7707th European Command Intelligence Center.
- Thomas, Nigel (2015). Hitler's Russian & Cossack Allies 1941–45. Men-at-Arms. Osprey Publishing. ISBN 978-1472806871.
- Thomas, Geoffrey J.; Ketley, Barry (2015). Luftwaffe KG 200: The German Air Force's Most Secret Unit of World War II. Stackpole Books. ISBN 978-0-8117-1661-1.
- Wildt, Michael (2009). An Uncompromising Generation: The Nazi Leadership of the Reich Security Main Office. University of Wisconsin Press. ISBN 9780299234645.
