= GULAG Operation =

Anti-Soviet military operation in Northern Russia and Siberia

- Part of Operation Zeppelin
- Type: Guerrilla warfare
- Location: Komi ASSR
- Planned: Mid-1942
- Planned by: Soviet POWs in German captivity
- Commanded by: Ivan Georgievich Bessonov; Mikhael Meandrov
- Objective: Instigate a guerrilla war in Northern Russia and Siberia against Soviet authorities
- Date: 2–9 June 1943
- Outcome: Operational failure: NKVD detects guerrillas; Bessonov and Meandrov executed following end of war
- Casualties: 4 (2 in June 1943, Bessonov and Meandrov after end of war)

The GULAG Operation was a German military operation in which German and Soviet anti-communist troops were to create an anti-Soviet resistance movement in Northern Russia and Siberia during World War II by liberating and recruiting prisoners of the Soviet GULAG system. Despite ambitious plans, only a small group of former Soviet POWs was airlifted to the Komi Republic in June 1943. Members of the group were captured or killed days after landing.

== Ambitious plans ==
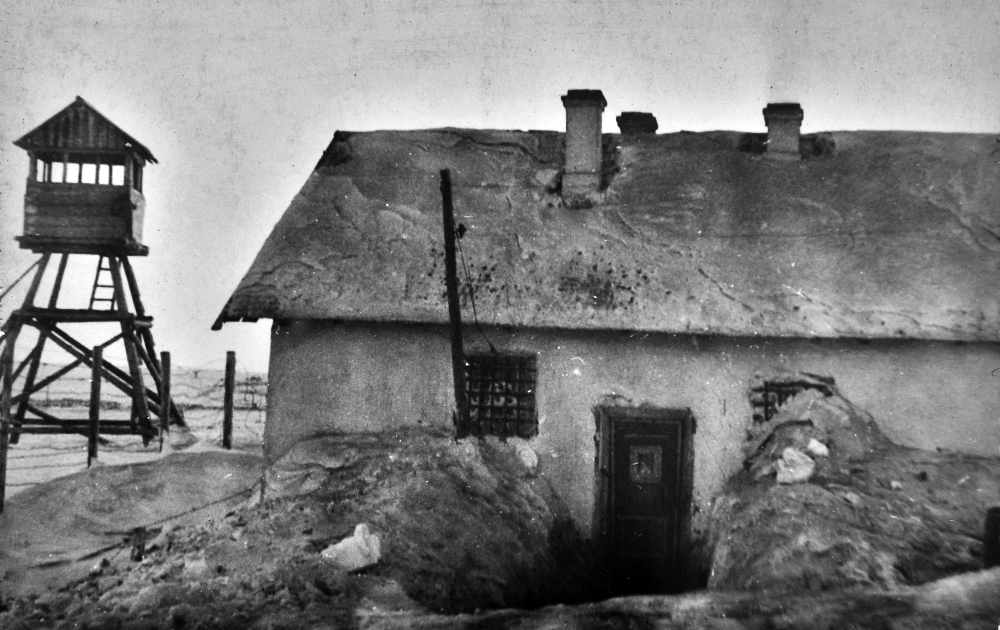
A punishment cell block in one of the subcamps of Vorkutlag. The GULAG Operation planned to liberate prisoners from camps like Vorkutlag in the Komi ASSR and recruit them for anti-Soviet guerrilla warfare.

The plan was designed in mid-1942 by Soviet POWs in German captivity in the Hammelburg POW camp, primarily by an NKVD officer, Brigade Commander Ivan Georgievich Bessonov, and a Red Army officer, Colonel Mikhael Meandrov. The plan, part of the German efforts to create anti-communist resistance behind the Soviet lines, called for a naval and air invasion of Siberia by German forces and defectors from the Red Army, targeting the GULAG penal system camps, recruiting more anti-Soviet forces from the prisoners, and thus opening a second front in the war between Nazi Germany and Soviet Union.

The plan called for the creation of insurgent activity in the extensive region from the Northern Dvina River to the Yenisey and from the extreme north to the Trans-Siberian Railway. The region of the planned actions was divided into three operational zones: Northern (right shore of the flow of northern Dvina), central (near the Pechora River) and eastern (from the Ob River to the Yenisey). Landing force members had to seize the GULAGS, free and arm the prisoners and deportees and move with them in the general direction of the south.

== Implementation and aftermath ==
The plan, part of the larger Operation Zeppelin, was analysed and tentatively approved by the Reich Security Head Office (RSHA) and steps were taken towards implementing it. About 150 Soviet POWs were conscripted into the units that were to be used in the operation: two assault groups of 50–55 people each, the group of the radio operators consisting of 20–25 people and the support (medical) female group of 20 people.

On 2 June 1943, the first group of 12 former Soviet POWs, trained by the Germans and dressed in NKVD uniforms, were airdropped in the Komi Republic. On 9 June, the group was however detected (two killed, rest taken prisoner) by real NKVD troops.

Soon after this failure, the Germans decided to abandon the operation. The anti-communist group that Bessonov founded in the POW camp was disbanded, and he himself was transferred to the Sachsenhausen concentration camp. Some of Bessonov's organisation members were employed in other German anti-Soviet operations, without any notable successes. Bessonov and Meandrov survived the war to be executed by the Soviet authorities after being transferred to their custody.

== See also ==
- Anti-Soviet partisans
  - Other Axis-affiliated anti-communist guerrillas:
    - 1940–1944 insurgency in Chechnya
    - Belarusian Black Cats
    - Crusaders (guerrilla)
    - Ukrainian Insurgent Army
    - Werwolf
- List of uprisings in the Gulag
- Yugoslav Partisans, a communist-led World War II resistance movement
