= Operation Schamil =

1942 German special forces attack in the USSR

Operation Schamil was a code-name for a German Abwehr operation to airdrop special forces ahead of the main attacking force against the Soviet town of Grozny which was a major oil production and refining center and, together with Maykop and Baku, was the primary objective for the German 1942 summer offensive by Army Group A led by Generalfeldmarschall Wilhelm List. It was named after Imam Shamil.

The plan called for the Lehr-Regiment Brandenburg zBV 800 (a special operations unit) to be dropped in advance of the 1st Panzer Army to establish contacts with the local insurgents, capture oil refineries by surprise, and protect them from destruction by the retreating Soviet Red Army. In August–September 1942, five groups (57 men in total) were parachuted into the Chechen-Ingush Autonomous Soviet Socialist Republic. They succeeded in capturing the oil refinery in Grozny, but had to retreat when the main German army was stopped about 55 miles (89 km) from Grozny. One of the groups succeeded in establishing contacts with rebel leader Hasan Israilov. Additional three groups (20 men) followed in August 1943; their task was to hinder Soviet counter-offensive.

In terms of ethnic background, the 77 men were 15 Germans, 21 Ossetians, 16 Ingush, 13 Chechens, five Dagestanis, three Circassians, two Georgians, a Russian and a Kazakh. These men were trained by the Operation Zeppelin which, over the course of the war, airdropped some 50 diversionary groups in North Caucasus and Transcaucasia.
