= Birche =

Indigenous king of Costa Rica

King of Talamanca
- Reign: January 1872 - 1874
- Predecessor: Santiago Mayas
- Successor: William Forbes
- Co-monarch: William Forbes (until 1874)
- Born: Costa Rica
- Died: Costa Rica

Birche was an indigenous king of Costa Rica at the end of the 19th century, pertaining to the Bribri ethnic group. He was a relative of King Santiago Mayas, in whose murder he participated in January 1872, due to his links with the rebel leader Lapis. He was proclaimed successor of Mayas and went to Limón to meet with the Costa Rican governor of the region, who granted him the governmental recognition, despite his participation in the regicide. As second leader was recognized another relative of his, William Forbes, nicknamed King Willie.

In December 1873 Birche visited San José and was designated by the government of Costa Rica as Political Chief of Talamanca. Short-range man, cowardly and despotic, the monarch soon faced strong opposition, led by Willie. In 1874 the governor of Limón suspended him as political leader and in September of that year Willie was appointed in his place. Years later, Birche tried to regain power and in 1879 there were riots in Talamanca, which made the Costa Rican government send in March 1880 a small military expedition to the region to restore order. Birche fled to Changuinola, and there they persecuted him without being able to apprehend him.
