= Siarke =

Ramón Almengor (known as Siarke; died 22 January 1922) was the last king of the Indigenous Bribris. The son of María Saldaña and Floripo Almengor, he was the nephew of Antonio Saldaña, the last king of Talamanca who died in 1910. While Saldaña enjoyed the recognition of Bribris, Cabécares, Changuinolas and Borucas and of the recognition (although only ceremonial) of the government of Costa Rica, Siarke was only recognized by the Bribris. He died of tuberculosis at the San Juan De Dios Hospital in San José on 28 January 1922.
