= Mairbek Sheripov =

Chechen military commander (1905–1942)

- Майрбек Шерипов
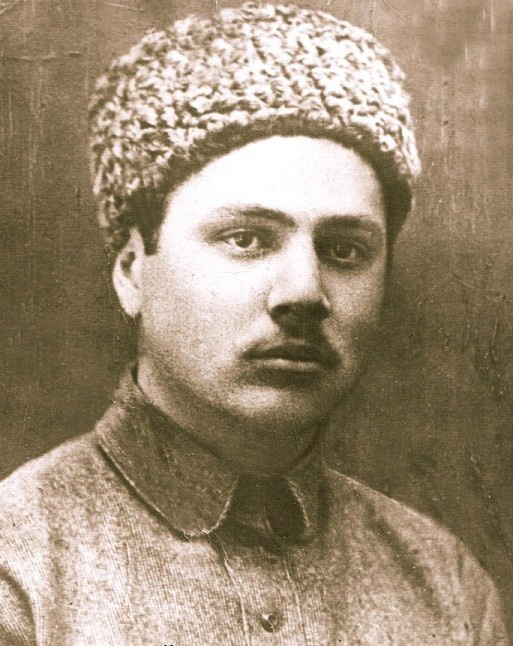
- Born: 1905
- Died: 7 November 1942 (aged 36–37)

Mairbek Sheripov (1905 – 7 November 1942) was a Chechen insurgent who was a leader in the 1940–1944 insurgency in Chechnya with Hasan Israilov before his death in 1942. He was initially a member of the Communist Party of the Soviet Union, but later led an insurgency as the leader of the Chechen-Mountaineer National-Socialist Underground Organisation.

== Early life ==
Mairbek Sheripov was born in 1905. He father was an office for the Russian Empire. His brother Aslanbek Sheripov was a Chechen revolutionary that was killed at the Battle of Vozdvizhenskaia in 1919.

Sheripov was a member of the Communist Party of the Soviet Union. He was an assistant to T. Elderkhanov, president of the Central Executive Committee of Chechnia. However, he lost his job when Elderkhanov was dismissed in 1926, after being accusing of associating with Ali Mitayev. He was arrested for anti-Soviet activities in 1938, but was released in 1939.

== Insurgency ==
Hasan Israilov and Sheripov led an insurgency in Chechnya in the 1940s. They launched their uprisings independently of one another and then joined forces. Sheripov's organisation was the Chechen-Mountaineer National-Socialist Underground Organisation (ChGNSPO). The Soviets regained control over Chechnya by 1943.

Herbert Lange reported that Sheripov had around 1,000 men in his army, but that they were poorly armed and lacked ammunition. Lange stated that Sheripov was the "most intelligent leader" out of all of the Chechen insurgents. Sheripov was killed by the NKVD on 7 November 1942.

== Works cited ==
=== Books ===
- Avtorkhanov, Abdurahman (1992). The North Caucasus Barrier: The Russian Advance towards the Muslim World. St. Martin's Press. ISBN 0312075758.
- Marshall, Alex (2010). The Caucasus Under Soviet Rule. Routledge. ISBN 9780415410120.
- Perovic, Jeronim (2018). From Conquest to Deportation: The North Caucasus under Russian Rule. Oxford University Press. ISBN 9780190942991.

=== Journals ===
- Khalilov, Roman (2003). "Moral justifications of secession: the case of Chechnya". Central Asian Survey. 21 (4). Routledge: 405–420.
- Midlarsky, Manus (2009). "Territoriality and the onset of mass violence: the political extremism of Joseph Stalin". Journal of Genocide Research. 11 (2). Routledge: 265–283.
