= Novolaksky =

Novolaksky (masculine), Novolakskaya (feminine), or Novolakskoye (neuter) may refer to:

- Novolaksky District, a district of the Republic of Dagestan, Russia
- Novolakskoye, a rural locality (selo) in the Republic of Dagestan, Russia
