= Cacicazgo of Talamanca =

Costa Rican Indigenous manor

Cacicazgo of Talamanca Cacicazgo de Talamanca
- 1576–1862
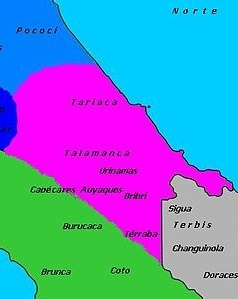
- Status: Cacicazgo
- Capital: Suinse
- Recognised national languages: Talamanca languages
- History
  - Spanish conquest of Costa Rica: 1576
  - Kingdom of Talamanca: 1862
Preceded by	Succeeded by
Pre-Columbian history of Costa Rica	Kingdom of Talamanca

The Cacicazgo of Talamanca was a Costa Rican Indigenous manor that existed prior to the Spanish conquest and during the colony. It had borders on the north with the kingdom of Tariaca (current Valle de la Estrella), on the west with Chirripó and on the southeast with the river Changuinola, natural border with the Terbis. Within the kingdom coexisted two Indigenous groups, the Bribris and the Cabécares.

The region remained untamed for a long time, subdivided into autonomous tribes called "nations" by the Spaniards, mainly of Bribri, Térraba, Cabécar, Terbi, and Mexica. The Spaniards maintained a geopolitical frontier relationship rather than domination due to the hostility with which these peoples resisted the attempts of Spanish political and religious control as much by the arms as by escaping towards inhospitable zones, and due to the complex division of the kingdom in independent nations that made them more difficult to dominate since it required the submission one by one (unlike other areas of America where huge territories were politically unified by pre-Hispanic empires). What caused Costa Rica to take longer to be entirely colonized than the rest of Central America. From 1660 the governor of Cartago begins a series of expeditions that sought to subdue the Talamancans, most of them which were unsuccessful. Despite the Indians agreed to submit to the Spanish authority as a way to protect themselves from the constant attacks of English pirates and Miskitos, but the policies imposed by the Spanish (as a ban on polygamy and shamanism) led to a revolt in 1662 that, coupled to the Spanish political rivalries incapable of specifying the answer, Talamanca and Tariaca once again became independent regions. In 1665 Governor Juan Lopez de la Flor applied a new strategy to conquer the area and settle for capturing Indigenous people to use them as slaves in plantations, carrying out raids on the Indigenous villages in which they abducted their inhabitants. Captain Juan de Vida Martell, along with 88 soldiers in 1666, razed several Indigenous peoples burning their ranches and crops and taking more than one hundred Indians as slaves.

The Franciscans had more success in their missions since 1670, achieving massive baptisms, despite the revolt of the Chánguenas and Urinamas that threatened to burn their missions put a stop to the process. The region would continue besieged by ethnic and religious tensions and constant uprisings, the best known being that of the Indigenous king Pablo Presbere (1670-1710) who, although repressed, had the desired result on a large scale and Talamanca once again became a practically autonomous de facto zone and the Spaniards retreated. It would not be until 1740 that new attempts of evangelization and military conquest would be carried out in the area, although with ambiguous results.
