= Santiago Mayas =

Indigenous king of Costa Rica

King of Talamanca
- Reign: 1862 - January 1872
- Predecessor: Chirimo
- Successor: Birche
- Monarch: Chirimo (until 1870)
- Born: c. 1834; Costa Rica
- Died: January 1872; Costa Rica

Santiago Mayas (1834–1872) was an indigenous King of Talamanca, Costa Rica. He belonged to the ethnic group of the Bribris, of which he was crowned in 1862, although subject to the authority of King Chirimo, which he succeeded around 1870. In his youth he befriended many foreign visitors, and as king appointed as his secretary the American marine John H. Lyon, who married one of his relatives.

Santiago Mayas was the first indigenous king of Costa Rica to visit the cities of Cartago and San José, in 1871. He was described as an intelligent man, with a firm will and good judgment, but he got drunk often and then acted violently and despotic. He was married to three women.

The authority of King Santiago was challenged in 1871 by his cousin Lapis, who was the second indigenous chief of the region. Lapis tried to assassinate the monarch, but he had news of the conspiracy and ordered to arrest him, who managed to escape to the mountains, where he died of hunger. However, in January 1872, several friends and relatives of Lapis, including a noble named Birche, ambushed King Santiago Mayas, who was shot dead; They set fire to their palenque, and seized his women and all his property. His relative Birche succeeded him as king.
