= Pablo Presbere =

Costa Rican politician

Pablo (originally Pabru) Presbere (1670? -1710) was an Indigenous king of the community of Suinse, in the region that is now known as Talamanca, in the south-east of Costa Rica. He is remembered as the indigenous leader who led the aboriginal insurrection in "Tierra Adentro" (an area on the Talamanca mountain range) against the Spanish authorities on September 29, 1709, in the course of which several friars and soldiers and the wife of one of these were killed and fourteen temples erected by the missionaries were set ablaze. The rebellion was supported by all the natives of Costa Rica from Cerro Chirripó to Isla Tojar, in Almirante Bay, Panama, with the exception of the Viceitas, and allowed the aboriginals to regain control of the territory of Talamanca, which became a refuge area during the colonial period of Costa Rica. He was known as the most feared warrior in Talamanca. Some sources argue that his original indian name "Pabru" means "chief of the macaw" and "Preberi" would be "Place of running waters". The macaw is a bird of religious significance for the Bribri people thus, some scholars argue that Presbere was actually a shaman or religious leader and not from a warrior caste, which may also explain both the respect that he inspired in other natives and the fear that the Spaniards had for him.

== Biography ==
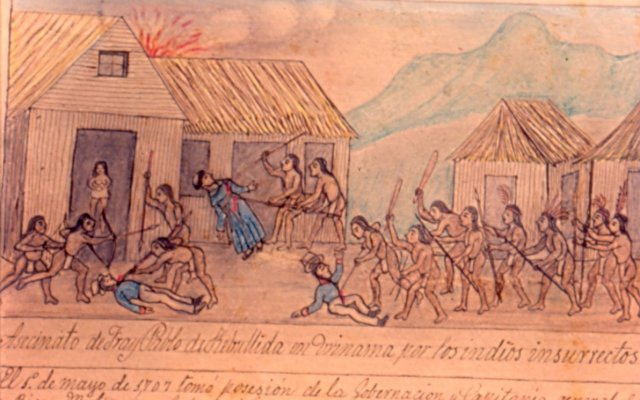
Presbere's rebellion.

The reason for the indigenous uprising of 1709 was the interception, by Presbere, of a letter ordering the uprooting of the Talamanca Indians from their lands and transferring them, by force, to the villages of Boruca, Chirripo, and Teotique. Secretly reunited in Suinse with the head of the Cabécares, Comesala, both chiefs quietly organized the stockpile of spears made of hardened wood and leather shields.

On September 28, 1709, under the command of a group of Cabécares and Teribes, and allied with the chief of Cabécar Comesala, Presbere attacked the convent of Urinama, where they killed Fray Pablo de Rebullida - who had lived in Talamanca for 15 years and spoke seven indigenous languages - and two soldiers. Rebullida died of a thrown and its corpse was decapitated, because among these natives appropriating the head of an enemy meant to appropriate the powers that this one had in life. After attacking Urinama, the army of Presbere went to Chirripó, where another friar was killed, Antonio de Zamora, two soldiers, a woman and her son, as well as some indigenous acolytes of the friars. They continued on their way to Cabécar, where five Spanish soldiers died, while the remaining eighteen fled towards Tuis, twelve leagues from Cartago, where they tried to resist, but then chose to continue towards Cartago. The Indians in arms burned fourteen churches founded by the missionaries, the convents and town houses, and destroyed the images and sacred objects of the friars, because these were a symbol of the threat they represented to their traditional order.

The authorities of Cartago decided to carry out a punishment expedition. The governor and captain general of the province of Costa Rica, Lorenzo Antonio de Granda y Balbín, asked the Audiencia of Guatemala to send 75 firearms, one hundred knives, 800 pounds of gunpowder, 4 thousand bullets and 4 thousand pesos. It was organized in Cartago, in February 1710, an army of 200 men who attacked Talamanca by two flanks, using the town of San José Cabécar as headquarters. Presbere went to take refuge in the village of Viceita with all his people, and after a hard scuffle, finally the viceites were forced to hand him over. Presbere was captured, the indigenous chiefs of Talamanca Siruro, Bocri, Iruscara, Bettuqui and Dapari, and 700 indigenous people, after a month of searching the mountains. The other leader of the revolt, Comesala, managed to escape.

Of the total of the 700 Indians captured, for their use as slaves, upon arrival in Cartago the number was 500, while 200 died on the road or escaped. Nine years after his capture, the governor of Costa Rica reported that of these 500, 300 had died from smallpox and measles.

In Cartago, Presbere and the other indigenous leaders were put on trial by Governor Lorenzo Antonio de Granda y Balbín. At the trial, Presbere did not admit any responsibility in the uprising and claimed that he was in another town when the events occurred. He refused to give up any of his fighting companions. On the contrary, the other indigenous people tried with him indicated him as leader of the insurrection. The documents record his haughty behavior. He gave his testimony in his native language, the Bribri, because he did not speak Spanish. As a justification for the rebellion, he said that he had been informed that the friars wrote letters asking soldiers to get the Indians out of their villages.

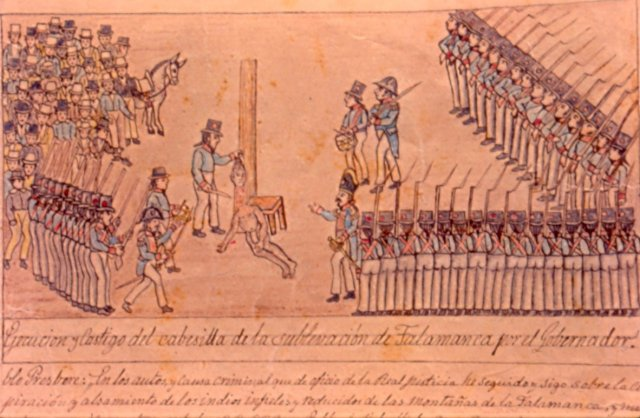
Presbere's execution.

On July 1, 1710, Presbere was sentenced to death by garrote, since Costa Rica had no executioner to apply the cruel death typical of the colonial era called "garrote vil", which consisted of the prisoner being seated in a chair to apply a tourniquet on the neck to which it was slowly turned.

== Legacy ==
After the insurrection of Pablo Presbere, the indigenous people of Talamanca reinforced their identity and dominion in that territory, increasing their function as a refuge zone for the aborigines who managed to escape to Spanish rule. In a certain way, this allowed the subsistence of the traditions, identity and language of these cultures to this day. The rebellion of Presbere is still considered as the maximum protest action Talamanqueño indigenous before the Spanish submission. Even with the capture of the 700 Indians, from the point of view of these the rebellion was a success, since the Spaniards had to leave the South Caribbean region as a result of it, which allowed Talamanca to recover its independence and sovereignty. The name of Presbere was recorded in the collective memory of the Talamanca indigenous people as a symbol of resistance to foreign invaders.

On Wednesday, March 19, 1997, the Legislative Assembly of Costa Rica declared Pablo Presbere defender of the freedom of indigenous peoples. Pablo Presbere was declared benefactor of the country in the area of defenders of freedom.

In Costa Rica several monuments have been dedicated: one of 3.12 m high, made of copper, which is in front of the Municipality of Limón, inaugurated in 1993, and another that is a bronze bust that is in the courtyard of the Legislative Assembly of Costa Rica.
