= Hasan Israilov =

Chechen guerilla leader (1910–1944)

- Israil Khant Hasan (Исраил КIант Хьасан)
- Born: 1910; Galanchozh, Chechnya, Russian Empire
- Died: December 15, 1944 (aged 33–34); Checheno-Ingush ASSR, Soviet Union
- Cause of death: Killed in action
- Occupations: Guerrilla fighter, journalist, poet

Hasan Israilov (Chechen: Исраил КIант Хьасан / Israil Khant Hasan; Russian: Хасан Исраилов Khasan Israilov; 1910 – December 29, 1944) was a Chechen nationalist, guerrilla fighter, journalist, and poet who led Chechen and Ingush resistance and a rebellion against the Soviet Union from 1940 until his death in 1944. Israilov is regarded as one of the most influential Chechen resistance leaders during World War II, and he is considered by many Chechens to be a national hero. His name is also sometimes transliterated to Latin alphabet as Hassan Izrailov.

== Early life ==
Israilov was born in 1910 in the village of Galanchozh, Chechnya, as the youngest of six brothers. He was from the Terloy teip. He finished secondary school in Rostov in 1929. He joined Komsomol, the youth wing of the Communist Party of the Soviet Union in 1919. Graduating from a communist secondary school in Rostov-on-Don in 1929, Israilov entered the ranks of the Communist Party, and in 1933 he was sent to Moscow's Communist University of the Toilers of the East.

As a student Israilov wrote plays and poetry, and he became a correspondent for the Moscow newspaper Krestianskaia Gazeta (Farmer's Newspaper). A couple of his articles attacked the Soviet policy in the Checheno-Ingushetia, which he described as "plundering Chechnya by the Party leadership". Although he instantly became popular with his peers, the Soviet leadership arrested him swiftly at the age of 19, on charges of "counterrevolutionary slander", and was sentenced to ten years in prison after he had written an editorial accusing certain Party officials of "looting and corruption", but after two years Israilov was released, rehabilitated, and allowed to return to his university after several of the Party members Israilov had accused were charged with corruption.

Returning to Moscow, Israilov met with other Chechen and Ingush students, including Abdurakhman Avtorkhanov and his elder brother Hussein, and they came to the conviction that a continuation of Soviet policy toward Chechen and Ingush Autonomous Oblasts would inevitably lead to popular uprisings. In 1935, Israilov once again fell into legal troubles when his signature was found on a student petition critical of Soviet policy in the North Caucasus, and he was sentenced to five years' forced labor in Siberia. Israilov was released early in 1939 and he returned to Chechnya to work as a barrister in Shatoy.

== Rebel leader ==
In 1940, after hearing of Finland's resistance against Soviet aggression, Israilov and his brother Hussein organized and led the 1940–1944 insurgency in Chechnya, during which he presided over the Provisional Popular Revolutionary Government of Checheno-Ingushetia.

In February 1944, Israilov had managed to elude the Soviet deportation of all Chechens and Ingushes, although his entire family had been either deported or executed outright, and he was rendered extremely vulnerable to capture. Although forced confessions from colleagues led the NKVD to many of Israilov's weapons and equipment, he eluded arrest for the next ten months hiding from cave to cave as a fugitive, burdened by the weight of the deportation of his people. In a top secret communication among Soviet officers, it was reported that Israilov had been killed on December 15, and his corpse being photographed and identified on December 29, 1944. Soviet security forces would continue to hunt the remnants of the Chechen guerrilla opposition in the North Caucasus until 1953.
