= 1940–1944 insurgency in Chechnya =

Revolt against the Soviet Union

- Part of the Eastern Front of World War II, the Battle of the Caucasus and the Chechen–Russian conflict
Date	January 1940 – 15 December 1944
Location	Chechen-Ingush ASSR and parts of Dagestan ASSR, Russian SFSR, Soviet Union
Result	Soviet victory; Deportation of Chechens and Ingushes

Belligerents
Provisional Popular Revolutionary Government of Chechnya-Ingushetia	Soviet Union

Commanders and leaders
Hasan Israilov †; Mairbek Sheripov †; Akhmed Khuchbarov	(Soviet Union) Vasily Khomenko † (Soviet Union) Nazirov Mukhadin †

Units involved
Partisan detachment of Ahmed Khuchbarov	58th Army; NKVD

Strength
5,000; 14 people (Israilov's group)	110,000 (Operation Lentil)

Casualties and losses
657 killed 3,875 captured according to the GARF	200 killed

The 1940–1944 insurgency in Chechnya (Russian: Восстание Хасана Исраилова) was an autonomous revolt against the Soviet authorities in the Chechen-Ingush Autonomous Soviet Socialist Republic. Beginning in early 1940 under Hasan Israilov, it peaked in 1942 during the German invasion of North Caucasus and ended in the beginning of 1944 with the wholesale concentration and deportation of the Vainakh peoples (Chechens and Ingushes) from their native lands as well as from the locations across the USSR, resulting in the death of at least 144,000 civilians. However, scattered resistance in the mountains continued for years.

== Beginning ==
In January 1940, encouraged by the Soviet failures in the Winter War against Finland, Chechen ex-communist intellectual Hasan Israilov and his brother Hussein had established a guerrilla base in the mountains of south-eastern Chechnya, where they worked to organize a unified guerrilla movement to prepare an armed insurrection against the Soviets. By early February 1940, Israilov's rebels took over several auls in Shatoysky District. The rebel government was established in Israilov's native village of Galanchozh. They then defeated the NKVD's punitive detachments sent against them, capturing modern weapons.

Israilov described his position on why they were fighting numerous times:

"I have decided to become the leader of a war of liberation of my own people. I understand all too well that not only in Checheno-Ingushetia, but in all peoples of the Caucasus it will be difficult to win freedom from the heavy yoke of Red imperialism. But our fervent belief in justice and our faith in the support of the freedom-loving peoples of the Caucasus and of the entire world inspire me toward this deed, in your eyes impertinent and pointless, but in my conviction, the sole correct historical step. The valiant Finns are now proving that the Great Enslaver Empire is powerless against a small but freedom-loving people. In the Caucasus you will find your second Finland, and after us will follow other oppressed peoples."

"For twenty years now, the Soviet authorities have been fighting my people, aiming to destroy them group by group: first the kulaks, then the mullahs and the 'bandits', then the bourgeois-nationalists. I am sure now that the real object of this war is the annihilation of our nation as a whole. That is why I have decided to assume the leadership of my people in their struggle for liberation."

After the German invasion in the USSR in June 1941, the brothers convened 41 different meetings in summer 1941 to recruit local supporters under the name "Provisional Popular Revolutionary Government of Chechen-Ingushetia", and by the end of midsummer of that year they had over 5,000 guerrillas and at least 25,000 sympathizers organized into five military districts encompassing Grozny, Gudermes and Malgobek. In some areas, up to 80% of men were involved in the insurrection. It is known that the Soviet Union used carpet bombing tactics against the revolutionaries, causing losses primarily to the civilian population. Massive Soviet bombing air raids twice targeted Chechen-Ingush mountain villages in the spring of 1942, completely devastating several auls and killing most of their inhabitants, including large numbers of elderly and children.

By January 28, 1942, Israilov had decided to extend the uprising from Chechens and Ingush to eleven of the dominant ethnic groups in the Caucasus by forming the Special Party of Caucasus Brothers (OKPB), with the aim of an 'armed struggle with Bolshevik barbarism and Russian despotism'. Hasan also developed a code among the guerrilla fighters to maintain order and discipline, which stated:

Brutally avenge the enemies for the blood of our native brothers, the best sons of the Caucasus; Mercilessly annihilate seksoty [secret agents], agents and other informants of the NKVD; Categorically forbid [guerrillas] to spend the night in homes or villages without the security of reliable guards.

In February 1942, another Chechen ex-communist, Mairbek Sheripov, organized a rebellion in Shatoi and tried to take Itum-Kale. His forces united with Israilov's army relying on the expected arrival of the German Wehrmacht. In neighbouring Dagestan rebels also took the neighbourhoods of Novolakskaya and Dylym. The insurrection provoked many Chechen and Ingush soldiers of the Red Army to desert. Some sources claim that the total number of the mountaineers deserting reached 62,750, exceeding the number of mountaineer fighters in the Red Army. In fact, this figure refers to the whole North Caucasus for the whole period of the war.

== German support ==
On August 25, 1942, nine German-trained saboteurs from Abwehr's Nordkaukasisches Sonderkommando Schamil landed near the village of Berzhki in the area of Galashki, where they recruited 13 local Chechens for their cause. Later in August and September, a total of 40 German agents were dropped in various locations. Their mission was to seize the Grozny petroleum refinery in order to prevent its destruction by the retreating Soviets, and to hold it until the German First Panzer Army arrived. However, the German offensive stalled after capturing only the ethnic-Russian town of Malgobek in Ingushetia. The Germans made concerted efforts to coordinate with Israilov, but his refusal to cede control of his revolutionary movement to the Germans, and his continued insistence on German recognition of Chechen independence, led many Germans to consider Israilov as unreliable, and his plans unrealistic. Although the Germans were able to undertake covert operations in Chechnya—such as the sabotage of Grozny oil fields—attempts at a German–Chechen alliance floundered.

That the Chechens actually were allied to the Germans is highly questionable and usually dismissed as false. They did have contact with the Germans. However, there were profound ideological differences between the Chechens and the Nazis (self-determination versus imperialism), neither trusted the other, and the German courting of the Cossacks angered the Chechens (their traditional enemies with which they still had numerous land disputes and other conflicts). Mairbek Sheripov reportedly gave the Ostministerium a sharp warning that "if the liberation of the Caucasus meant only the exchange of one colonizer for another, the Caucasians would consider this [a theoretical fight pitting Chechens and other Caucasians against Germans] only a new stage in the national liberation war."

== Deportation ==
By 1943, as the Germans began to retreat in the Eastern Front, the mountain guerrillas saw their fortunes change as many former rebels defected to the Soviets in exchange for amnesty. On December 6, 1943, German involvement in Chechnya ended when Soviet counter-intelligence agents infiltrated and arrested the remaining German operatives in Chechnya. After the German retreat from the Caucasus, almost 500,000 Chechen and Ingush people from Checheno-Ingushetia as well as other republics were forcibly resettled to Siberia and Central Asia (mostly to Kazakhstan SSR) en masse, resulting in a large number of deaths among the deportees. Many of those who were not deported were simply massacred on the spot. In mountainous regions of the country, mass atrocities such as the Khaibakh massacre are claimed to have taken place (although the evidence on this incident is in doubt and has been questioned by scholars).

By the next summer, Checheno-Ingushetia was dissolved; a number of Chechen and Ingush placenames were replaced with Russian ones; and a campaign of burning numerous historical Chechen texts was nearly complete. Throughout the North Caucasus, about 700,000 (according to Dalkhat Ediev, 724,297, of which the majority, 479,478, were Chechens, along with 96,327 Ingush, 104,146 Kalmyks, 39,407 Balkars and 71,869 Karachays) were deported. Many died along the trip, and the extremely harsh environment of Siberia as well as of other regions the people were deported to (especially considering the amount of exposure) killed many more.

The NKVD, supplying the Soviet perspective, gives the statistic of 144,704 people killed in 1944–1948 alone (death rate of 23.5% per all groups), though this is dismissed by many authors such as Tony Wood, John B. Dunlop, Moshe Gammer and others as a gross understatement. Estimates for deaths of the Chechens alone (excluding the NKVD figures), range from about 170,000 to 200,000, thus ranging from over a third of the total Chechen population to nearly half being killed in those 4 years alone (rates for other groups for those four years hover around 20%).

In 2004, the European Parliament recognized it as a genocide.

Some rebel groups stayed in the mountains, continuing the resistance. Rebel groups were also formed in Soviet Kazakhstan. Israilov was betrayed and killed by two of his own men in December 1944. Following his death, the resistance was led by Sheikh Qureish Belhorev, who was captured in 1947. Several security divisions were sent to suppress the remnants of partisan movement, achieving this task only in the mid-1950s.
