= Soviet partisans in Latvia =

The Soviet partisans in Latvia were Soviet partisans who were deployed to Latvia and attempted to wage guerrilla warfare against the German armed forces during the German occupation of Latvia. Partisan activity was singularly unsuccessful in Latvia due to the general resistance of the population to the Soviet regime that the partisans represented.

== Background and origins ==
The war between Germany and the Soviet Union broke out after one year of Soviet occupation in Latvia.

In the month of June and July 1941 the German Army occupied territory of Latvia. The territory of German-occupied Latvia was incorporated into Reichskommissariat Ostland. In "Generalbezirk Lettland" was established German civilian administration and German police force. Also, in 1941 Germans began to create Latvian Police Battalions.

On May 30, 1942, the Central Headquarters of the Partisan Movement was organized in Moscow. The Staff had its liaison networks in the Military Councils of the Fronts and Armies. The territorial Staffs were subsequently created, dealing with the partisan movement in the respective Soviet Republics and in the occupied provinces.

28 September 1942 - the Staff of Latvian Partisan Movement was established to organize and unite pro-Soviet factions and forces into the resistance. From January 1943 the Soviet partisans in Latvia were under the leadership of A. K. Sproģis.

The partisans recruited in these units had an organized hierarchy system, a system of subordination, and a system of wages similar of the Red Army. Selection, preparation, armament and leadership of the units were the responsibility of the leadership of the Red Army.

== The partisan warfare ==
The first Soviet partisan units sent into territory of Latvia from the end of 1941 to mid 1944 were quickly annihilated. Activity picked up in the second half of 1942, one year after the first winter war, but real work by the partisans in Latvia started only in 1943 after the German Army Group B stalled at Stalingrad and Kursk. The partisan regiment Par Padomju Latviju (For Soviet Latvia) was organized under the command of Vilhelms Laiviņš and Otomārs Oškalns and started training in June 1942 in Leningrad and from Staraya Russa, three small Latvian partisan units (about 200 men) headed for Latvia. July 7, the regiment with combat reached Latvian Kārsava region, but there the German found and dispersed them with great losses and only several partisans escaped. Next partisan unit was formed September 1942 near Moscow from volunteers, from 201st Latvian Riflemen Division and Par Padomju Latviju combatants. Commander of these units was Vilis Samsons, who later became a Soviet historian. In March this unit was renamed to Latvian Partisan Brigade. This partisan regiment combat began East of Latvian borders and only at the end of 1943 they entered the territory of Latvia. Since the local population in Latvia would not support Soviet partisans, they could not gain a foothold. 3,000-man unit of Vilis Samsons was credited with the destruction of nearly 130 German trains; however, this seems to be a fabrication. Leningrad partisan brigade, which consisted only of Russians (commander M.I. Klementjev) fought around Lake Lubāns. In 1944 and 1945 in Courland they formed many small partisan units (2 to 12 men each) but very active. The most active one was the Sarkanā bulta ('The Red Arrow'). The Latvian Red partisans suffered great losses, and many from smaller groups were eliminated.

According to statistics of Communist Party of Latvia, from 1941 to 1944 4055 military trained, armed and tested soldiers, organizers and lookouts were deployed to Latvia from the USSR. On January 4, 1944, Latvian Partisan Movement Headquarters had 812 soldiers at its disposal. This testifies that 3243 (80%) of the soldiers early deployed to Latvia either died, were wounded, or were declared missing in action.

During Nazi occupation of Latvia, Latvian Soviet partisans produced and distributed several illegal newspapers («Mūsu zeme» («Our land»), «Par Dzimteni» («For the Motherland»), «Jaunais Latvietis» («Young Latvian»), etc.) and several hand-written leaflets.

== Local resistance ==
Many Latvians were actively involved in the resistance movement against the policies of the German occupation regime. Daugavpils was the scene of fierce Jewish resistance during the Holocaust.

== Consequences ==
More than 1000 Soviet partisans who fought in Latvia in 1941-1944 were awarded the orders, decorations, and medals of the Soviet Union and three of them (Otomars Oškalns, Imants Sudmalis and Vilis Samsons) were awarded the title Hero of the Soviet Union

== War crimes ==
Pro-soviet resistance groups in Latvia were the perpetrators of a number of war crimes. On 27 May 1944, a partisan brigade led by Vasilijs Kononovs arrived in the village of Mazie Bati in Mērdzene parish of Ludza county and, by shooting or burning alive, killed nine residents of the village, including Tekla Krupnika, who was in her last month of pregnancy, as they accused the villagers of helping the Germans.

On 14 April 1945, Anatolijs Maksimovs's reconnaissance group raided the "Vētri" homestead in Puze Parish of Ventspils county, killed all six civilians and burned the houses. On the night of 5–6 May, the same group raided the homesteads of "Ābeļkalni" and "Zīļi" in Pope Parish, killed 9 (according to other sources, 11) people and burned the houses.

== See also ==
- Belarusian partisans
- Forest Brothers
- Jewish partisans
- Lithuanian partisans
- Polish partisans
- Soviet partisans
- Latvian anti-Nazi resistance movement 1941–1945
- Military history of Latvia during World War II
- Vassili Kononov
- Arturs Sproģis

== Sources ==
- Strods. Heinrihs. PSRS kaujinieki Latvijā (1941—1945). I daļa. Riga 2006 ISBN 9984-643-78-6
- Я.П. Крастынь. Борьба латышского народа против немецких захватчиков и поработителей. / под ред. П.И. Кушнера; Институт истории АН СССР. М., Госполитиздат, 1946 - 196 стр.
- M. Vestermanis. Fronte bez fronte līnijas. Rīga, 1958.
- А.К. Рашкевиц. Записки партизана. Рига, Латгосиздат, 1963. - 336 стр.
- Я. Дзинтарс. Период массовой антифашистской подпольной борьбы в оккупированных фашистами городах Латвийской ССР // «Известия Академии наук Латвийской ССР», No. 5, 1965.
- Н.С. Шестаков. "Парашюты раскрылись ночью..." М., 1967. - 47 стр., илл.
- А.К. Рашкевиц. Народные мстители Латвии. М., Воениздат, 1973. - 164 стр.
- П.В. Гродненский. На берегах Кухвы. Рига, "Лиесма", 1978 - 135 стр., илл.
- Я.К. Дзинтарс. Сияй, звёздочка! Борьба пионеров Латвии против гитлеровских оккупантов. Рига, "Лиесма", 1979. - 247 стр., илл.
- И.Г. Капитанов. Возмездие: очерки о Даугавпилсском подполье, 1941-1944 (в 2-х кн.). Часть 1. Рига, "Лиесма", 1977
- И.Г. Капитанов. Возмездие: очерки о Даугавпилсском подполье, 1941-1944 (в 2-х кн.). Часть 2. Рига, "Лиесма", 1980
- В.П. Самсон. Дружба народов победила: совместные действия красных партизан и советских разведчиков в "Курляндском котле" в 1944-1945 гг. Рига, "Авотс", 1980. - 274 стр.
- Ф.Н. Рекшня, Х. Галинь. Спартак в Курземе. Рига, "Лиесма", 1981. - 195 стр.
- И.К. Богодистый, В.И. Боярский. Три года в тылу врага. Рига, "Авотс", 1982. - 135 стр., илл.
- Антинацистские партизаны в Латвии 1942 – 1945. / сб. воспоминаний, сост. В. Известный. Рига, изд-во "Jumi", 2008.
- Yaacov Falkov, Between the Nazi Hammer and the Soviet Anvil: The Untold Story of the Red Guerrillas in the Baltic Region, 1941-194, in Chris Murray (ed.), Unknown Conflicts of the Second World War: Forgotten Fronts (London: Routledge, 2019), pp. 96–119. ISBN 978-1138612945
