= Otomārs Oškalns =

Latvian communist and Soviet partisan

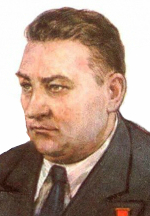
- Born: 12 April 1904; Kaive Parish, Governorate of Livonia, Russian Empire
- Died: 1 September 1947 (aged 43); Riga, Latvian SSR, Soviet Union
- Military career
- Allegiance: Soviet Union
- Service years: 1941–1945
- Nickname: Little
- Unit: 3rd Latvian partisan brigade
- Conflicts: World War II
- Awards: Hero of the Soviet Union; Order of Lenin; Order of the Patriotic War, 2nd class

Otomārs Aleksandrs Oškalns (12 April 1904 — 1 September 1947) was a prominent Latvian communist and partisan fighter.

He was one of three Latvian Soviet partisans who became Heroes of the Soviet Union.

== Life ==
Born in to the family of a farm laborer, in 1925 Oškalns received his teacher's exam.

In 1934 he was arrested for political activities after the Ulmanis Coup.

In 1939 he joined the Communist Party of Latvia, and in 1940 he became a member of the Supreme Soviet of the Latvian SSR. After Nazi Germany invaded Latvia in 1941, Oškalns was active as a leader of communist partisans. from April 30, 1942 he was commissar of the Latvian Soviet partisan detachment "For Soviet Latvia" ("Par Padomju Latviju"), which operated as part of the 2nd Leningrad Partisan Brigade. Later, he was the commander of the 3rd Latvian partisan brigade. Member of the Task Force of the Central Committee of the CPL (b).

In 1944, Oškalns became the first secretary of the Riga Regional Committee of the Communist Party of Latvia. After the war, In 1946 he became the Minister of Technical Cultures of the Latvian SSR and a deputy of the Supreme Soviet of the Soviet Union.

He is buried in Riga.

== Awards ==
- Hero of the Soviet Union (1945)
- Order of Lenin
- Order of the Patriotic War II class
- medals

== Memory ==
Small bronze monument was erected in Jēkabpils after his death.

After his death, Riga's second largest railway station was named after him.

When Latvia became independent in 1991, Oškalns was viewed as a Soviet collaborator, and his name was stripped from the railway station. Monuments to him were also removed from public locations.

== See also ==
- Arturs Sproģis
- Imants Sudmalis
- Vasiliy Kononov
- Communist Party of Latvia
