= List of bridges in Latvia =

This list of bridges in Latvia lists bridges of particular historical, scenic, architectural or engineering interest. Road and railway bridges, viaducts, aqueducts and footbridges are included.

== Historical and architectural interest bridges ==
	Name	Latvian	Distinction	Length	Type	Carries Crosses	Opened	Location	Land	Ref.
1	Kuldīga Bricks Bridge	Kuldīgas ķieģeļu tilts		164 m (538 ft)	Masonry; 7 segmental arches, bricks	Road bridge Venta (river)	1874	Kuldīga; 56°58′12.2″N 21°58′38.1″E	Courland	
2	Oskars Kalpaks Bridge	Oskara Kalpaka tilts		132 m (433 ft)	Truss; Steel; Swing bridge	Road bridge Karosta Canal	1906	Liepāja–Karosta; 56°32′42.9″N 21°00′16.4″E	Courland	
3	Railway Bridge, Riga	Dzelzceļa tilts (Rīga)		850 m (2,790 ft)	Arch; Steel tied arch	Riga–Jelgava Railway; Daugava	1914	Riga–Zaķusala; 56°56′31.7″N 24°6′23.3″E	Vidzeme	
4	Stone Bridge, Riga	Akmens tilts		503 m (1,650 ft)	Beam bridge Steel, masonry piles	Road bridge Tramway of Riga; Daugava	1957	Riga; 56°56′40.4″N 24°6′3.3″E	Vidzeme	

== Major road and railway bridges ==
This table presents the structures with spans greater than 100 meters (non-exhaustive list).

	Name	Latvian	Span	Length	Type	Carries Crosses	Opened	Location	Land	Ref.
1	Vanšu Bridge	Vanšu tilts	312 m (1,024 ft)	595 m (1,952 ft)	Cable-stayed; Steel box girder deck, concrete pylon	4 lanes road bridge Krišjānis Valdemārs Street; Daugava	1981	Riga–Ķīpsala; 56°57′4″N 24°5′42″E	Vidzeme	
2	Southern Bridge	Dienvidu tilts	110 m (360 ft)(x5)	803 m (2,635 ft)	Extradosed; Steel box girder deck, 6 steel pylons	6 lanes road bridge Daugava	2008	Riga; 56°54′56.9″N 24°9′25.5″E	Vidzeme	

== Notes and references ==
- Nicolas Janberg. "International Database for Civil and Structural Engineering". Structurae.com.
- Others references

== See also ==
- Transport in Latvia
- List of national roads in Latvia
- Rail transport in Latvia
- Geography of Latvia
