= Soviet-occupied Latvia =

Soviet-occupied Latvia may refer to:

- Latvian Soviet Socialist Republic
- Soviet occupation of Latvia in 1940
- Soviet re-occupation of Latvia in 1944

== See also ==
- Baltic states under Soviet rule (1944–1991)
- German occupation of the Baltic states during World War II
- German occupation of Latvia during World War II
- List of military occupations of Latvia
- Museum of the Occupation of Latvia
- Occupation of Latvia by Nazi Germany
- Occupation of the Baltic states
- Soviet occupation of the Baltic states (1940)
- Soviet occupation of the Baltic states (1944)
