= German occupation of the Baltic states during World War II =

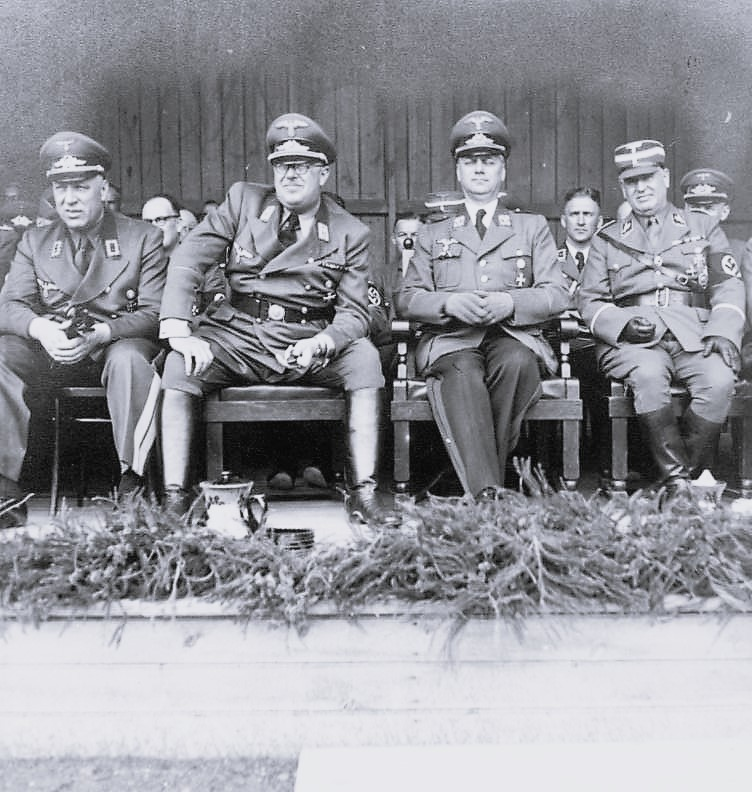
General Commissioner of Latvia Otto-Heinrich Drechsler, Reich Commissar for the Ostland Hinrich Lohse, Reich Minister for the Occupied Eastern Territories Alfred Rosenberg and SS Officer Eberhard Medem in 1942.

After the German invasion of the Soviet Union, the Baltic states were under military occupation by Nazi Germany from 1941 to 1944. Initially, many Estonians, Latvians, and Lithuanians considered the Germans liberators from the Soviet Union. The Balts hoped for the restoration of independence, but instead, the Germans established a provisional government. During the occupation, the Germans carried out discrimination, mass deportations, and mass killings, generating Baltic resistance movements.

== Under German rule ==
The Germans agreed to leave the Baltic states, except for Lithuania (which was later ceded in exchange for oil-rich regions of Poland), under the Soviet sphere of influence in the 1939 German–Soviet Pact. The Germans lacked concern for the fate of the Baltic states, and initiated the evacuation of the Baltic Germans. Between October and December 1939, the Germans evacuated 13,700 people from Estonia and 52,583 from Latvia, and resettled them in Polish territories incorporated into Nazi Germany. The following summer, the Soviets occupied and illegally annexed all three states. On 22 June 1941, the Germans carried out Operation Barbarossa. The Soviets had already implemented sovietization earlier, including the first mass deportation on 14 June, just eight days earlier, so the majority of Balts welcomed the German armed forces when they crossed the frontiers of Lithuania.

In Lithuania, a revolt broke out on the first day of the war, and a provisional government was established. As the German armies approached Riga and Tallinn, there were attempts to re-establish national governments. It was hoped that the Germans would re-establish Baltic independence. Such political hopes soon evaporated and Baltic cooperation became less forthright or ceased altogether. A growing proportion of the local populations turned against the Nazi regime as Germany turned the Baltic states—except for the Memel (Klaipėda) region annexed into Greater Germany in 1939—and most of Belarus into the Reichskommissariat Ostland, a colony in all but name in which the four predominant nationalities had little role in governance. Hinrich Lohse, a German Nazi politician, was Reichskommissar until he fled in the face of the Red Army's advance in 1944. Furthermore, Nazi Germany rejected the recreation of the Baltic states in any form in the future, as it unilaterally declared itself the legal successor to all three of the Baltic countries, as well as the Soviet Union, which it expected would collapse due to the German invasion.

Germans immediately initiated anti-Jewish persecution by deploying its mobile death squads, the Einsatzgruppen. The remainder of the Baltic peoples were deemed by the Nazis to be "a dying race" that needed to be "replaced by a more dynamic people", meaning Germans. The main Nazi plan for the colonization of conquered territories in the east, referred to as Generalplan Ost, called for the wholesale deportation of some two thirds of the native population from the territories of the Baltic states in the event of a German victory. The remaining third were either to be exterminated in situ, used as slave labour, or Germanized if deemed sufficiently "Aryan", while hundreds of thousands of German settlers were to be moved into the conquered territories. As Adolf Hitler explained in a conference on 16 July 1941, the Baltic states were to be annexed to Germany at the earliest possible moment, and some Nazi ideologists suggested renaming Estonia as Peipusland and Latvia as Dünaland and integrating them as German provinces. During the course of the war, the main thrust of Nazi racial policies was directed against the Jews, not so much the majority Baltic peoples.

Towards the end of the war, once it became clear that Germany would be defeated, many Balts and Estonians joined the Germans once again. It was hoped that by engaging in such a war, the Baltic countries would be able to attract Western support for the cause of independence from the USSR. In Latvia, an underground nationalist Central Council of Latvia was formed on 13 August 1943. An analogous body, the Supreme Committee for the Liberation of Lithuania, emerged on 25 November 1943. On 23 March 1944, the underground National Committee of the Estonian Republic was founded.

== Occupation of Estonia by Nazi Germany ==
After Nazi Germany invaded the Soviet Union on 22 June 1941, the Wehrmacht reached Estonia in July.

Although initially the Germans were perceived as liberators from the USSR and its repressions by most Estonians who hoped for the restoration of the country's independence, it was soon realized that they were merely another occupying power. Germans pillaged the country for the war effort and unleashed the Holocaust. Estonia was incorporated into the German province of Ostland. That made many Estonians unwilling to side with the Nazis to join the Finnish army to fight against the Soviet Union. The Finnish Infantry Regiment 200 (soomepoisid – 'Boys of Finland') was formed out of Estonian volunteers in Finland. 70,000 Estonians were recruited to the German armed forces (including Waffen-SS). Most of them joined in 1944, when the threat of a new invasion of Estonia by the Red Army had become imminent and it was clear that Germany would not win the war.

By January 1944, the front was pushed back by the Red Army almost all the way to the former Estonian border. Narva was evacuated. Jüri Uluots, the last legitimate Prime Minister of the Republic of Estonia (according to the constitution of Estonia) before its fall to the Soviet Union in 1940, delivered as a private citizen a radio address that implored all able-bodied men born from 1904 through 1923 to report for military service. (Before this, Uluots had opposed Estonian mobilization.) The call drew support from all across the country: 38,000 volunteers jammed registration centers. Several thousand Estonians who had joined the Finnish army came back across the Gulf of Finland to join the newly-formed Territorial Defense Force, assigned to defend Estonia against the Soviet advance. It was hoped that by engaging in such a war, Estonia would be able to attract Western support for the cause of Estonia's independence from the USSR and thus ultimately succeed in achieving independence.

== Occupation of Latvia by Nazi Germany ==
By 10 July 1941, the German armed forces had occupied all of Latvia's territory. Latvia became a part of Nazi Germany's Reichskommissariat Ostland as the Province General of Latvia (Generalbezirk Lettland). Anyone who was disobedient to the German occupation regime or had co-operated with the Soviet regime was killed or sent to concentration camps.

Immediately after the installation of German authority (the beginning of July 1941), a process of eliminating the Jewish and Gypsy population began, with many killings taking place in Rumbula. The killings were committed by Einsatzgruppe A, the Wehrmacht, and Marines (in Liepāja), as well as by Latvian collaborators, including the 500–1,500 members of the infamous Sonderkommando Arajs (or Arajs Kommando), which alone killed around 26,000 Jews, and the 2,000 or more Latvian members of the SD. By the end of 1941, almost the entire Jewish population had been exterminated. In addition, some 25,000 Jews were brought from Germany, Austria and the present-day Czech Republic, of whom around 20,000 were killed.

Latvia's population perished not only on the battlefield. During the years of Nazi occupation, special campaigns exterminated 18,000 Latvians, approximately 70,000 Jews and 2,000 Gypsies – in total about 90,000 people. The Latvians among these were mostly civilians whose political convictions were unacceptable to the German occupation force. Jewish and Gypsy civilians were eliminated as a result of Nazi Germany's racial policy. Persecutions were mostly carried out by special German units (Einsatzgruppe A, Sicherheitsdienst, or SD) and police units. The German occupation regime attempted to involve the local population in war crimes. Thus, Latvian self-defence units, security police units, and SD auxiliary units were created and included volunteers who carried out part of the terror campaign.

In 1943 and 1944, two divisions of Waffen SS were formed from Latvian volunteers to fight against the Red Army.

A large number of Latvians resisted the German occupation. The Latvian resistance movement was divided between the pro-independence units under the Latvian Central Council, led by Jānis Kurelis and Konstantīns Čakste, and the Soviet partisan units under the Central Staff of the Partisan Movement in Moscow. Their Latvian commander was Arturs Sproģis.

== Occupation of Lithuania by Nazi Germany ==
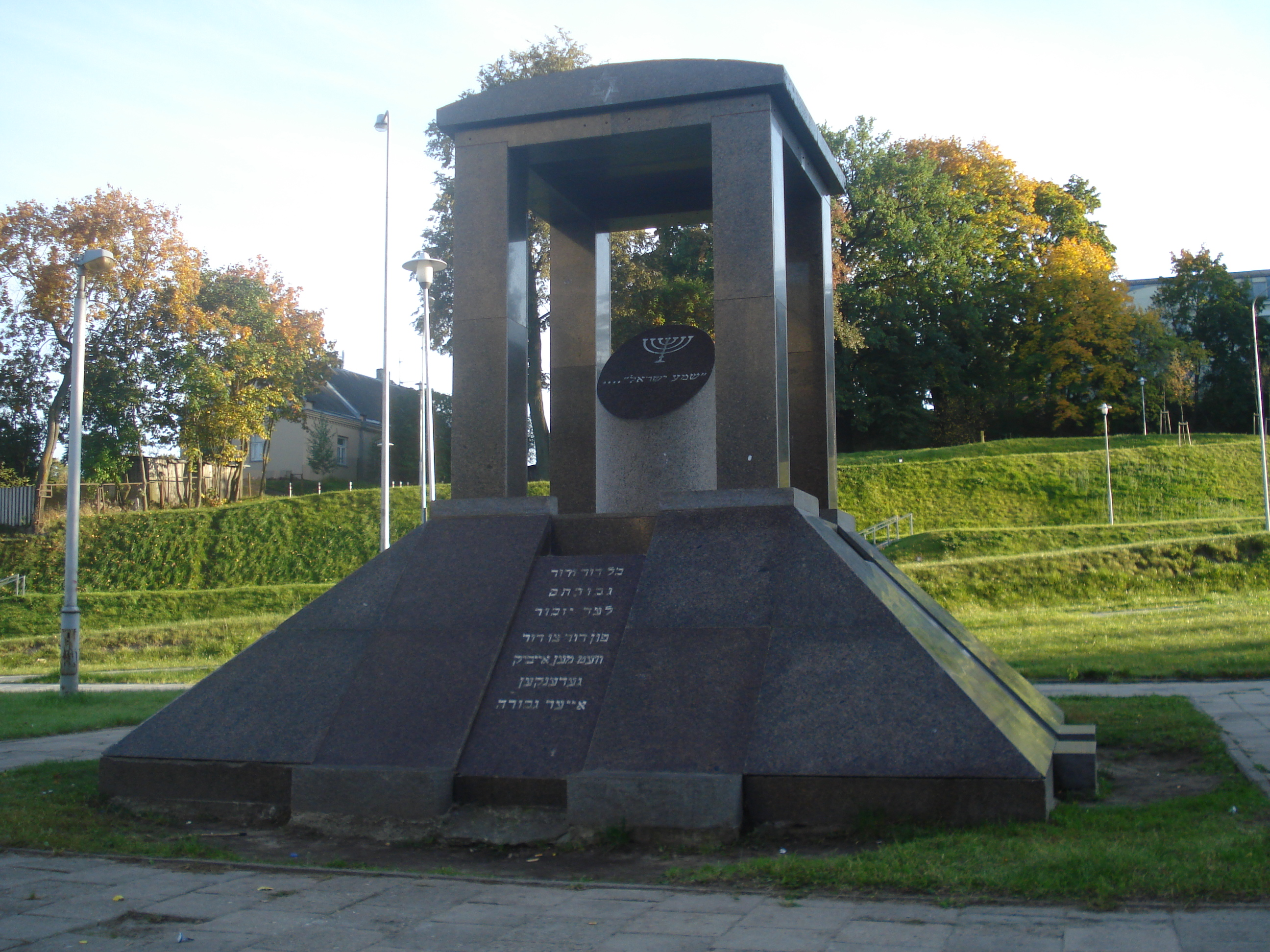
A Holocaust memorial near the site of the HKP slave labor camp in Subačiaus Street, Vilnius

The occupation of Lithuania by Nazi Germany refers to the period from the start of the German invasion of the Soviet Union to the end of the Battle of Memel (22 June 1941 – 28 January 1945). At first, the Germans were welcomed as "liberators" from the repressive Soviet regime. In the hope of re-establishing independence or at least gaining autonomy, Lithuanians organized their Provisional Government.
