= Ķīpsala =

Island and neighbourhood in Riga, Latvia

Coordinates: 56°57′22″N 24°04′52″E

- Neighborhood of Riga
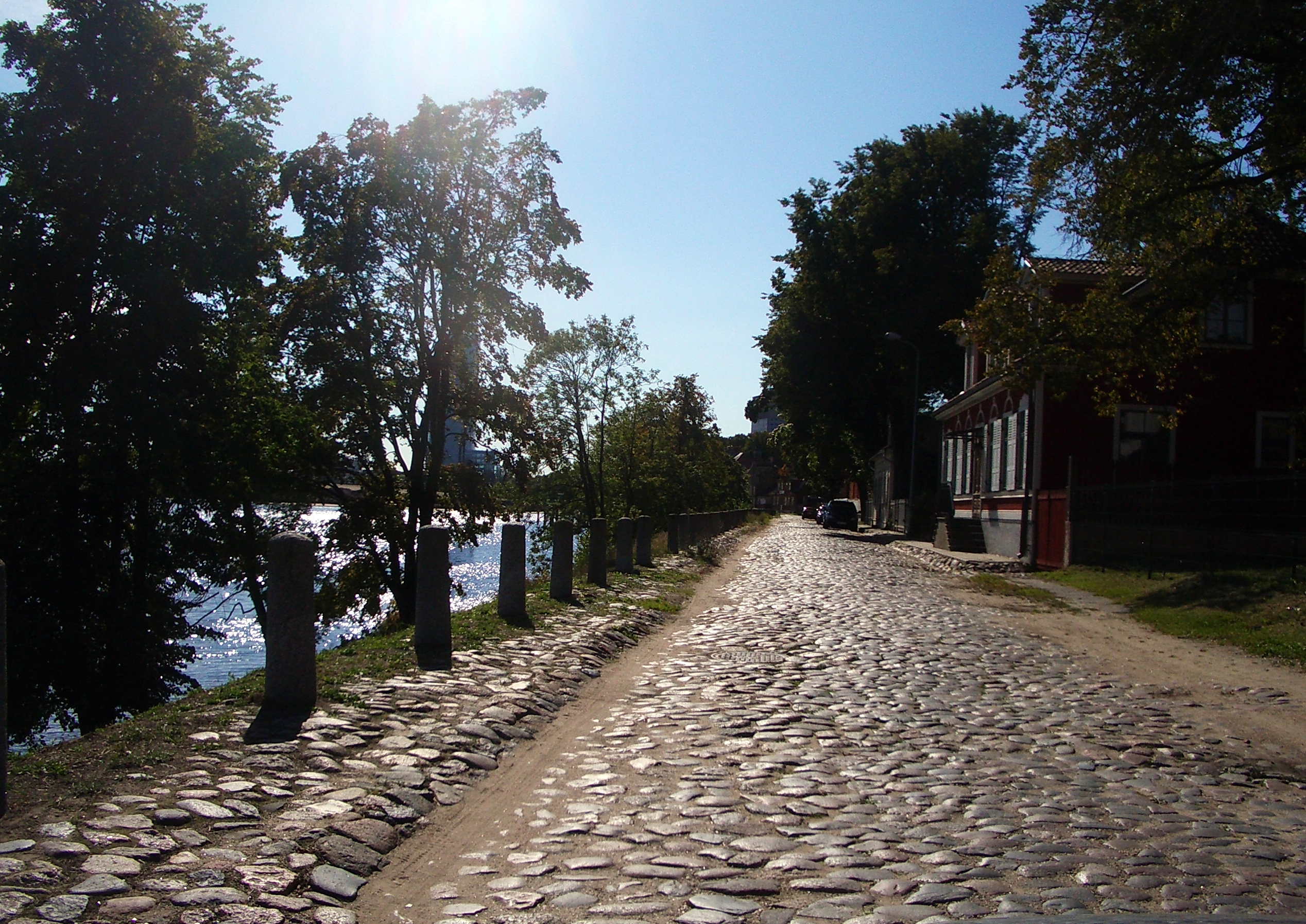
- River side promenade at Ķīpsala

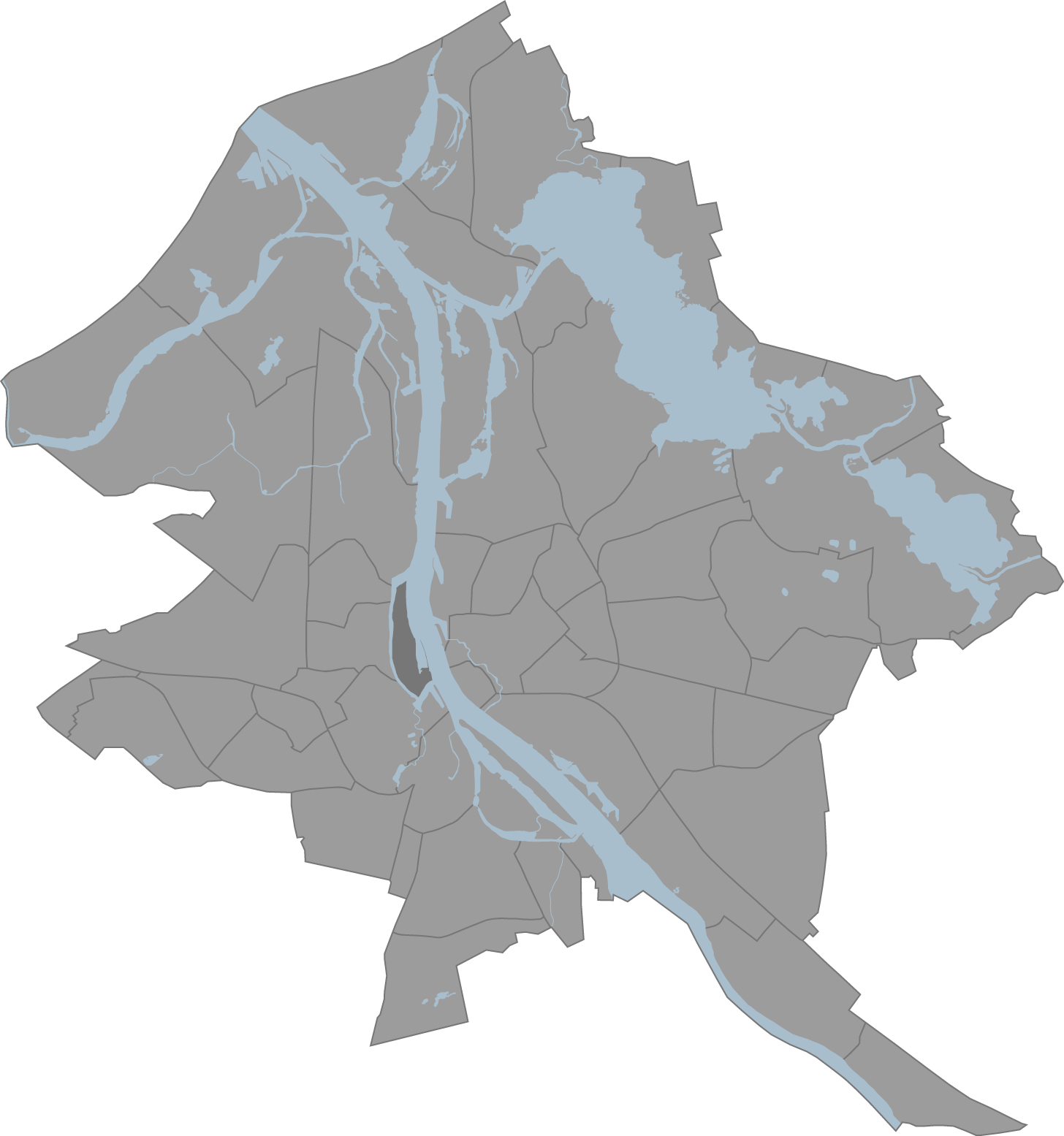
- Interactive map of Ķīpsala
- Country: Latvia
- City: Riga
- District: Kurzeme

Area
  - Total: 1.975 km^{2} (0.763 sq mi)

Population (2024)
  - Total: 841
  - Density: 426/km^{2} (1,100/sq mi)
- Time zone: UTC+2 (EET)
  - Summer (DST): UTC+3 (EEST)

Ķīpsala is an island on the left bank of the Daugava river, connected to Riga city center and Pārdaugava by the Shroud Bridge. Ķīpsala is divided from the rest of Riga by the Daugava in the east, Roņu dīķis in the north, Zunda in the west and Agenskalna līcis in the south.

== Buildings ==
In recent years Ķīpsala has become a prestigious area for living in Riga. There is a campus of the Riga Technical University including dormitories on Ķīpsala as well as the Olimpia shopping mall. The International School of Riga campus has also been located on Ķīpsala since 2001, but has moved in 2018.

The Žanis Lipke Memorial is located on the island at Mazais Balasta dambis 9. It was built next to the home of Jānis Lipke, where he had arranged a shelter for rescued Jews during the Nazi occupation.

== Gallery ==
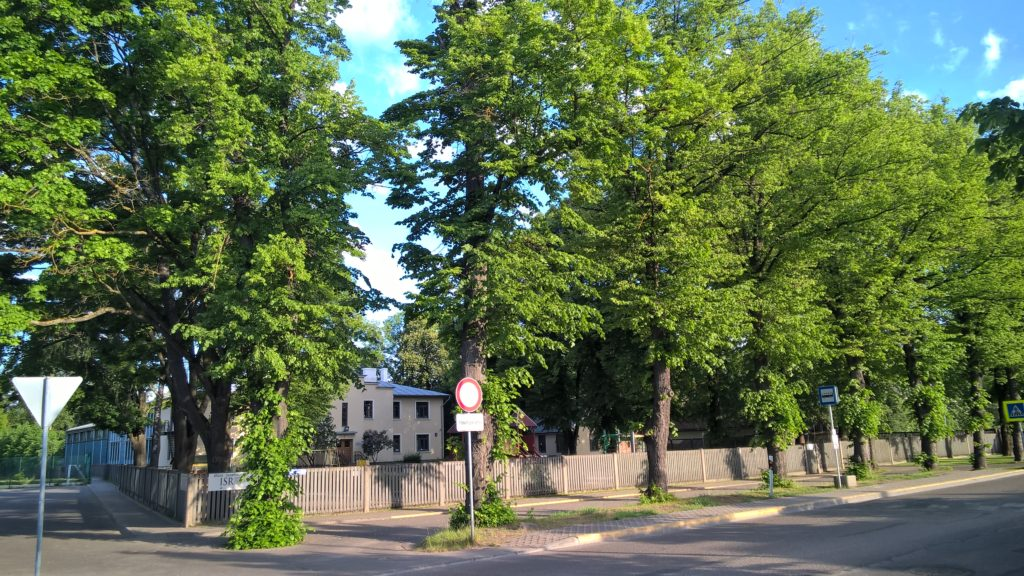
Zvejnieku street

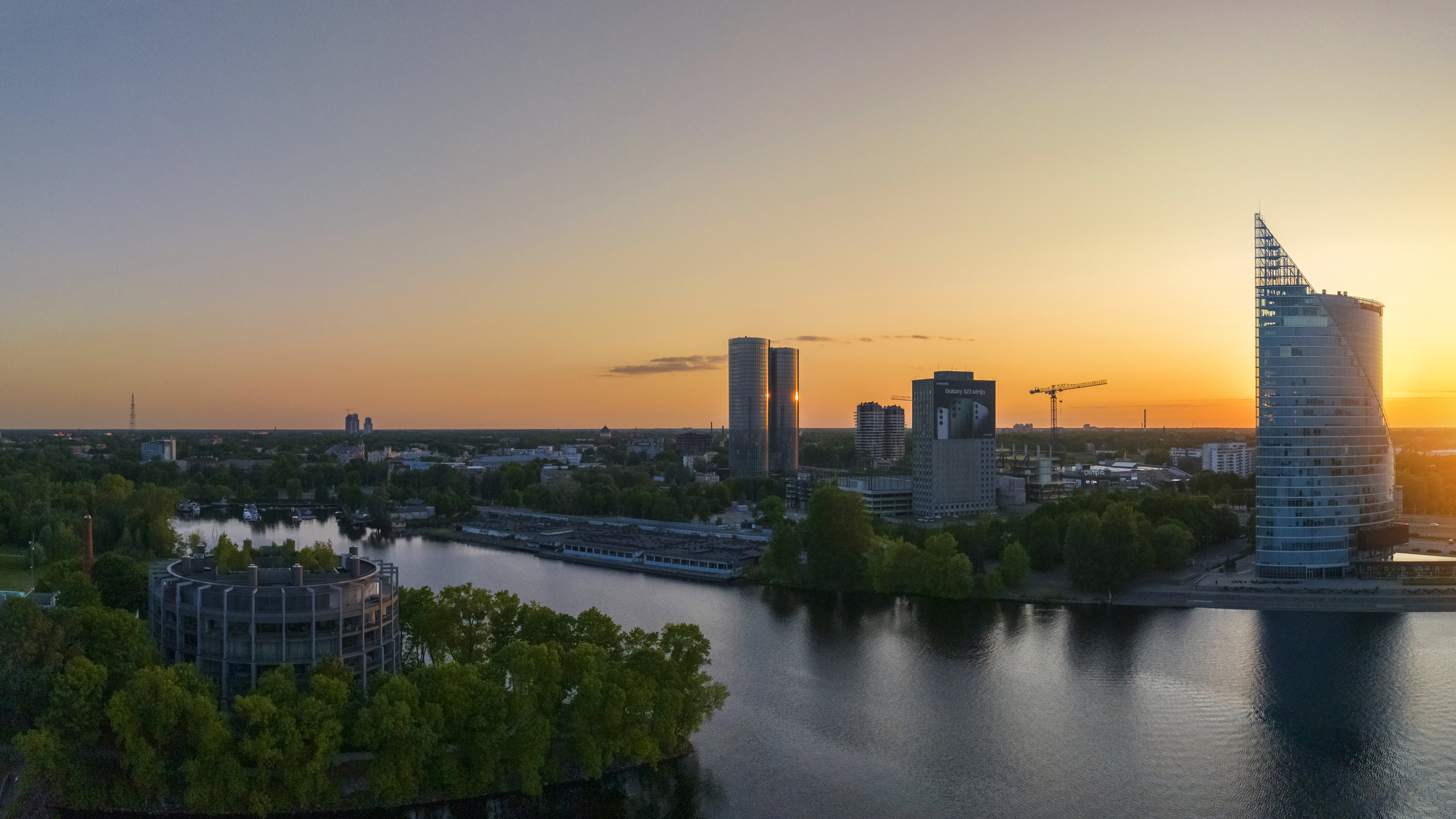
Southern part of the island

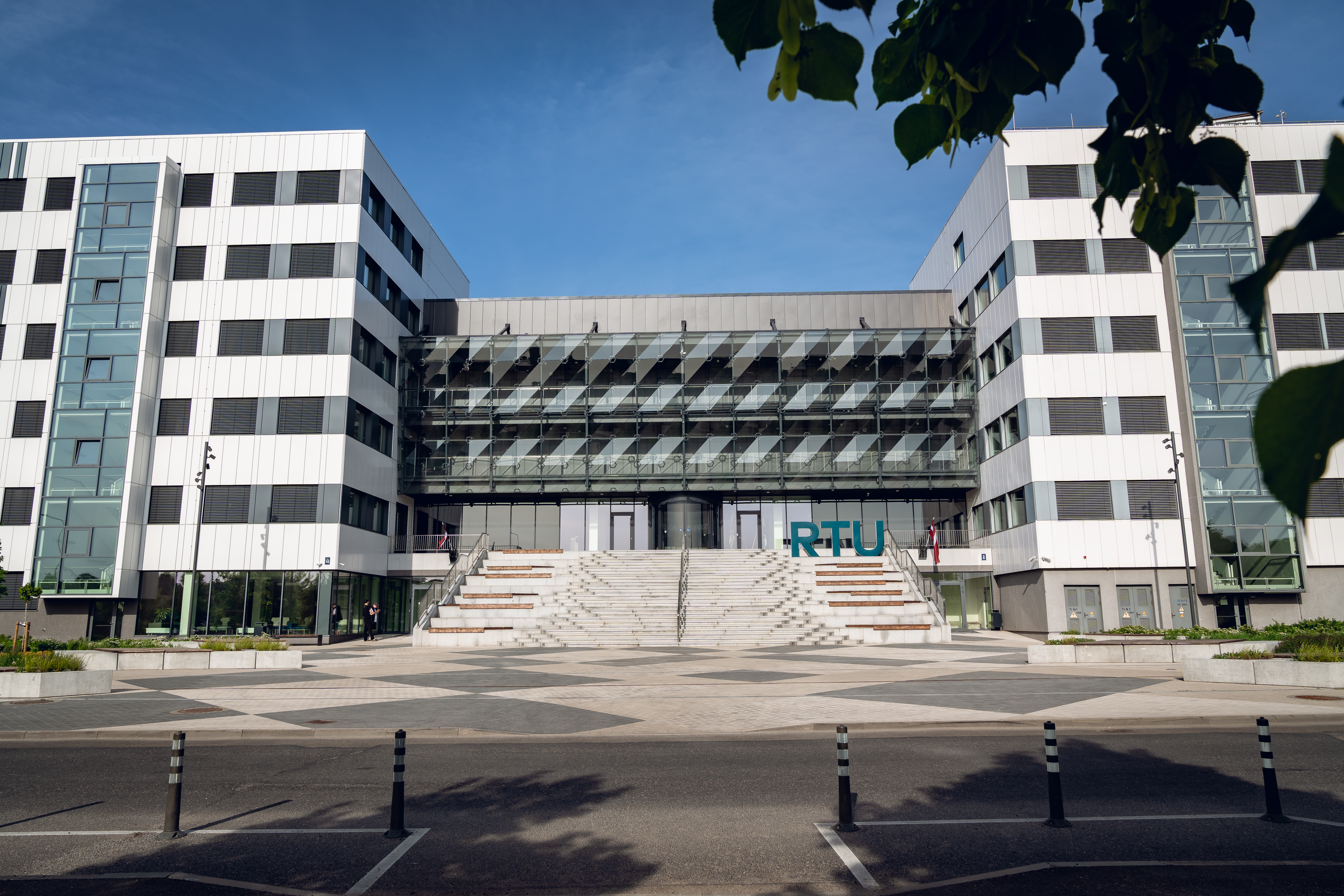
Main campus of the Riga Technical University
