= Latvian anti-Nazi resistance movement 1941–1945 =

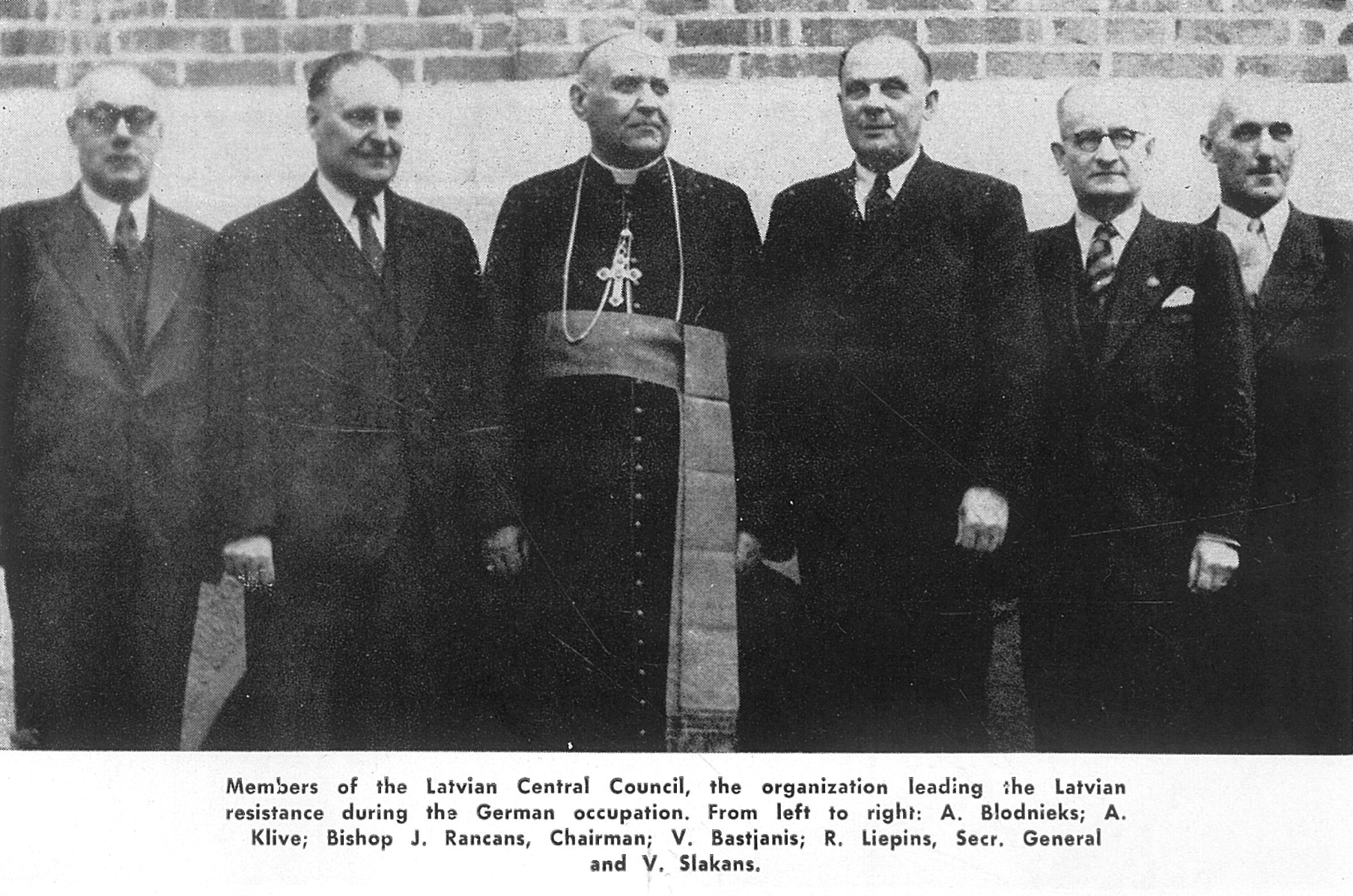
Members of the Latvian Central Council, one of the main anti-Nazi and anti-Soviet resistance groups

Many Latvians resisted the occupation of Latvia by Nazi Germany. Independent Latvia had been occupied by the Soviet Union in June 1940, then by Nazi Germany in July 1941, forming Generalbezirk Lettland. The Latvian resistance movement was divided between the pro-independence units under the Latvian Central Council and the pro-Soviet units under the Central Staff of the Partisan Movement in Moscow. Daugavpils was the scene of fierce Jewish resistance during the Holocaust. Many local Latvians were actively involved in the resistance movement against the ethnic policies of the German occupation regime. 134 Latvians were later honored with the title Righteous Among the Nations, among them is Žanis Lipke, who risked his life to save more than 50 Jews.

== National resistance movements ==
Civic circles in Latvia were dissatisfied with the German occupation regime and secretly plotted to reinstate democracy. There were many small underground groups of the national resistance movements focused on the restoration of the independence of Latvia like The Latvian Nationalist Union, Latvian National Council, the Officer Union, organizations “The Latvian Guards”, “New Regiments“, “The Free Latvia”, “The Latvian Hawk organization” and others. The radical nationalist organization “Pērkonkrusts” was allied with the Germans in the first months after the invasion, however, when repressed by the Germans it again started underground resistance.

=== Latvian Central Council ===
On August 13, 1943 members of the four biggest Latvian political parties founded the Latvian Central Council. It published the outlawed publications Jaunā Latvija (New Latvia) and Neatkarīgā Latvija (Independent Latvia). The periodicals propagated the idea of renewing democracy in Latvia after the war.

=== Kurelians ===
The Latvian Central Council managed to form their own military unit, disguised as a Home Guard unit, commanded by General Jānis Kurelis; the men were popularly known as Kurelians (Latvian: Kurelieši). The unit was organized on July 28, 1944, by a directive from Veide, the administrator of Rīga township, for the officially avowed purpose of fighting Soviet partisans who had recently been dropped by parachutes in great numbers, and for the formation of German-supported Latvian partisan groups which would operate in Soviet-occupied Latvian regions.

The size of the Kurelians is uncertain. Estimates range from 1,200 to 16,000, while the Germans were told that the group had only 500 men. Volunteers were attracted by word of mouth. The Kurelians expected ultimately to fight both Soviets and Nazis and to remain in Latvia as nationalist partisans if the Germans withdrew, or even to hold a part of Latvia until help arrived from the Western Allies. On September 23 the Kurelians retreated through Rīga to northern Courland, leaving behind a group of 150 men to operate in the Soviet rear. The Kurelians assisted the Latvian Central Council “boat actions” to Sweden and established radio contacts with Sweden.

On November 14 the Germans surrounded and disarmed the Kurelians at their HQ in Annahite Hunting Manor (Latvian: Annahites medību pils) in Stikli, Puze Parish, Ventspils county. Eight of their officers (including Upelnieks, a member of the military committee of the underground Latvian Central Council) were sentenced to death by a Nazi military tribunal and shot in Liepāja on November 19. A Kurelian battalion commanded by Lt. Rubenis fought the Germans for three days in "Ilziķi", Ugāle Parish, and was annihilated; Rubenis fell during a Latvian counter-attack trying to break through the German encirclement near Renda but some of the Kurelians escaped. General Kurelis was deported to Germany. 545 of his men were sent to the Stutthof concentration camp.

After mention of the Kurelians had been banned in Soviet-occupied Latvia, the Monument to the Executed of Kurelis' Battalion was first unveiled in 1994, close to the sea shore in Karosta, Liepāja, but was swept into the sea during a storm in January 2012. The new memorial, in the shape of a campfire site, stones with the names of the executed and a cross, was unveiled on 9 December 2013 closer to the city center and in the shelter of the Northern Forts, at the end of Kureliešu iela (Krasta iela until 2024). A memorial stone dedicated to the Kurelians was unveiled in 1997 near Annahite Manor in Stikli, and later restored in 2023.

== Soviet partisans ==
Armed combat behind the German front lines was carried out by the soldiers of the Red Army units: Latvian Riflemen Soviet Divisions and people's guards. Activity picked up in 1942, one year after the first winter war, but real work by the partisans in Latvia started only in 1943 after the German Army Group B stalled at Stalingrad and Kursk.

The partisan regiment Par Padomju Latviju ('For Soviet Latvia') was organized and started training in June 1942 in Leningrad, and from Staraya Russa three small Latvian partisan units (about 200 men) headed for Latvia. On July 7 the regiment reached the Latvian Kārsava region, but there the Germans found and dispersed them with great losses and only several partisans escaped.

The next partisan unit was formed in September 1942 by Moscow from volunteers from 201st Latvian Riflemen Division and the former fighters of Par Padomju Latviju. The commander was Vilis Samsons. This partisan regiment began fighting east of the Latvian border and only in the winter of 1943 did it start to fight in Latvia. In March this unit was renamed as the Latvian Partisan Brigade.

Since the local population in Latvia would not support Soviet partisans, they could not gain a foothold. From January 1943 the Red Partisans in Latvia were directly subordinated to the central headquarters in Moscow under the leadership of Arturs Sproģis. Another prominent commander was Vilis Samsons, who later became a historian.

Altogether Latvia had 24 partisan units, together with 33 smaller groups. From March 1944 until July they formed 4 partisan brigades: 1st Brigade with about 3000 men (commander V. Samsons) fought in Northern and Northeastern Latvia. 2nd Brigade (about 1500 men, commander Pēteris Ratiņš) fought in the centre of Latvia. 3rd Brigade (about 500 men, commander Otomārs Oškalns) fought at Zemgale, along with the 4th Brigade, also with about 500 men. The Leningrad Partisan Brigade, which consisted only of Russians (commander M. Klementyev) fought around Lake Lubāns. In 1944 and 1945 in Courland they formed many partisan units (2 to 12 men each) which, though small, were very active. The most notable of these was the Sarkanā bulta ('The Red Arrow'). The Latvian Red partisans suffered great losses, and many from smaller groups were completely eliminated. The Red partisan movement in Latvia ended in October 1944.

The groups were also responsible for documented war crimes, such as the execution of civilians in the village of Mazie Bati in Mērdzene Parish in May 1944 by a group led by Vasilijs Kononovs and in Ventspils county in April-May 1945 by the group of Anatolijs Maksimovs.

== See also ==
- Anti-fascism
- Estonian anti-German resistance movement 1941–44
- Latvian independence movement
- Resistance during World War II
- Resistance movement
- Lithuanian resistance during World War II
