= Žanis Lipke Memorial =

Museum in Latvia

Coordinates: 56.9540°N 24.0846°E

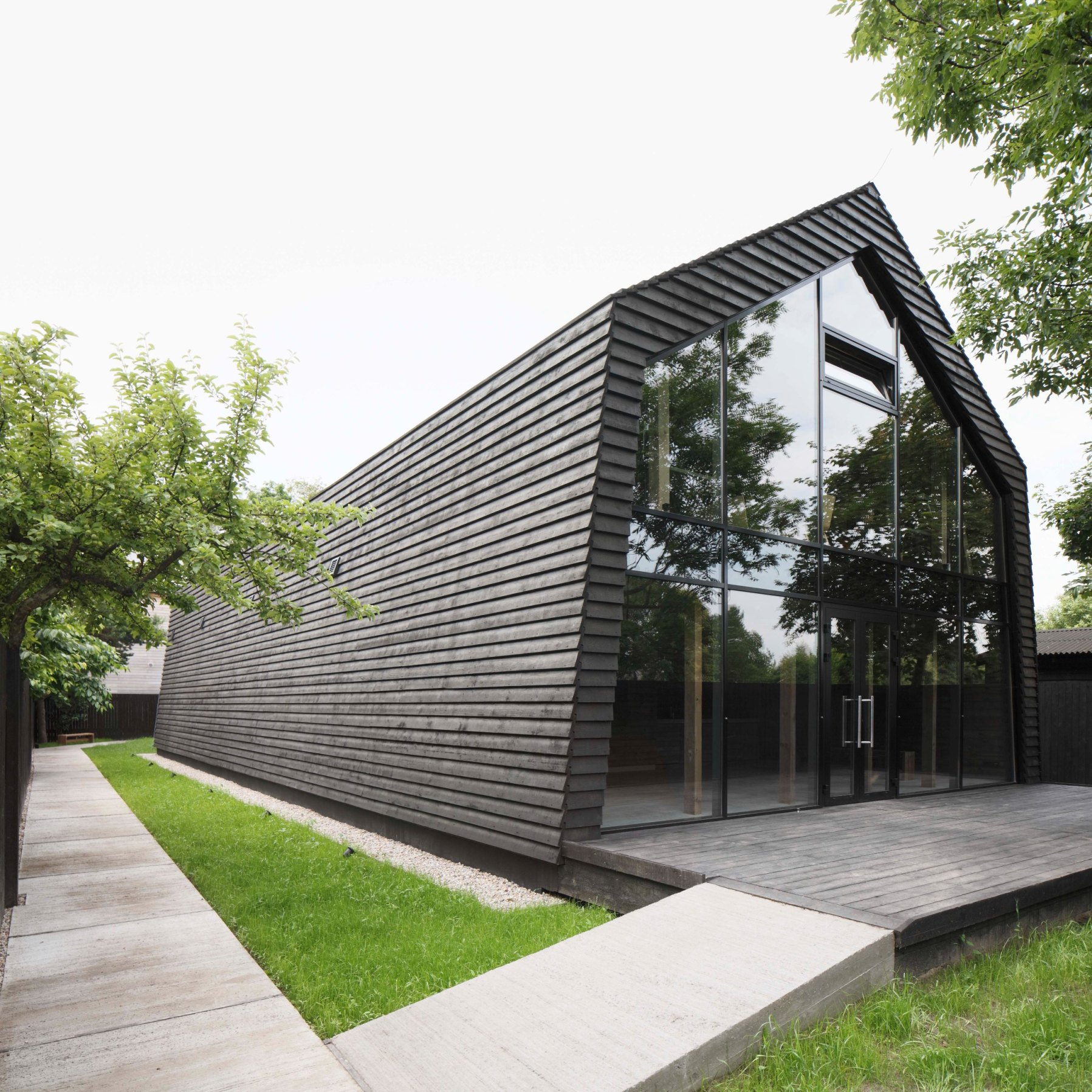
Žanis Lipke Memorial in Ķīpsala

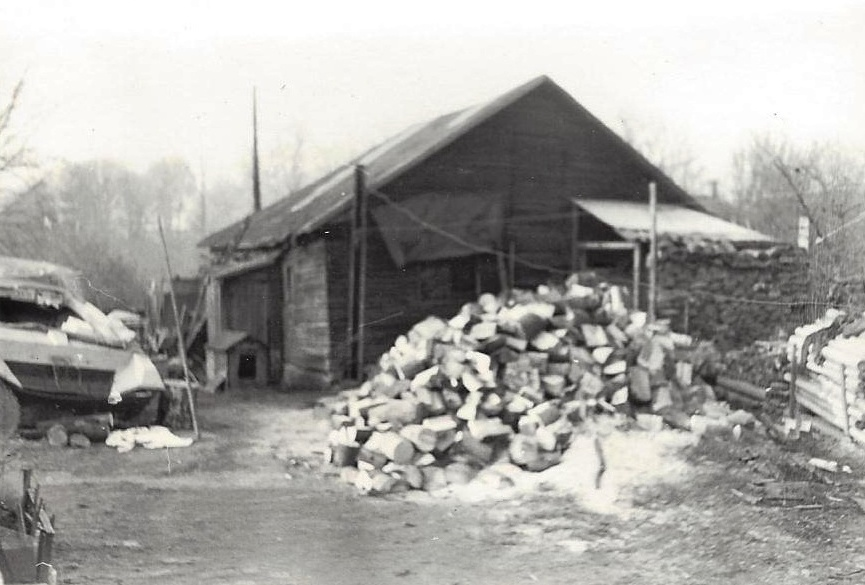
Firewood shed which housed the bunker in the 1970s

The Žanis Lipke Memorial (Žaņa Lipkes memoriāls) is a memorial museum located on the island of Ķīpsala in Riga, Latvia, at Mazais Balasta dambis, 9. It was opened in 2012 next to the former home of rescuer of Jews Žanis Lipke, where he had arranged a shelter for rescued Jews from the Riga Ghetto during World War II.

At the beginning of World War II, Žanis Lipke hid the first Jewish refugees in temporary hiding places in different locations in Riga. During winter of 1941/1942 harboring people in hideouts in Riga and his own house became too dangerous, so he started building a shelter under the woodshed that stood next to his house. In January 1942 he dug out the first bunker all on his own, working at nights. At the beginning this bunker housed four people. In 1942 it collapsed when the spring thaw set in. Žanis Lipke immediately built a better-designed replacement. This improved bunker housed 8-12 Jews at a time, from 1942 to the summer of 1944.

After the war Žanis Lipke used the bunker as a car pit. Over time, the pit caved in and the shed burned down in 1980s. Before the construction of the Memorial, a new shed was built for the Lipke family in the same place where the old shed with the secret bunker once stood.

== Original idea ==
In 2000 AD the founders of the society "Žanis Lipke Memorial" – entrepreneur Māris Gailis, the honorary director of International Film Forum "Arsenāls", Augusts Sukuts and the daughter-in-law of Žanis Lipke, Ārija Lipke came to the idea of creating the memorial, after the unveiling of a memorial plaque by Lipke's house in Ķīpsala, 8 Mazais Balasta dambis. Their aim was to bring local and international attention to the legacy of Žanis Lipke. In 2005 they founded a society to begin fundraising for building a memorial in Riga.

== Design concepts ==
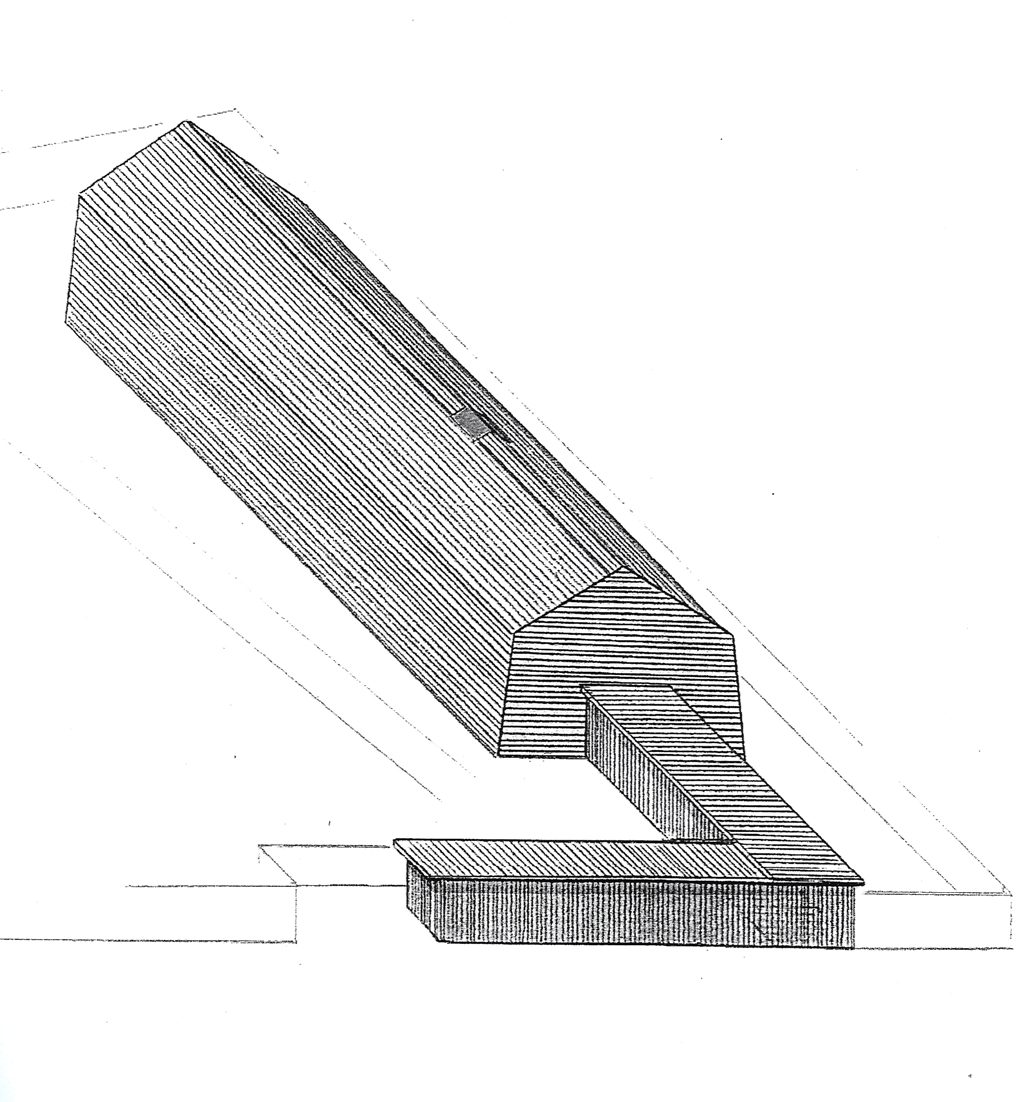
Sketch of Žanis Lipke memorial

The author of project of Žanis Lipke Memorial is architect Zaiga Gaile. Her idea for the external appearance of the building came from tarred sheds of Ķīpsala fishermen and seamen, who built them of heavy floated logs, with their characteristic color and smell. Conceptually and visually, the shape of the museum evokes Noah's Ark or an overturned boat, which too could be considered as a shelter of life.

On the basement floor of the memorial there is a bunker that matches the size of the original cache – 3x3m. Along its walls there are nine bunks attached to the wall. The bunker had two entrances – one was covered by a kennel, the other led to a nearby ravine, in case the bunker was discovered. During the construction of the bunker Žanis Lipke did not know how long people would have to hide in it, so he built it in such manner that kept its inhabitants connected to the outside world. They had newspapers brought to them as well as books. There was even electricity installed in the bunker and a radio was brought. Electricity was also used as a signal – if someone from Lipke family turned it off, it served as a signal that a stranger was approaching. Inhabitants of the bunker were supplied with weapons so they could defend themselves if necessary. Life in such cramped circumstances, and uncertainty of the future was a great emotional and spiritual challenge that sometimes led to conflicts.

Right above the bunker, on the first floor of the building, stands sukkah, a fragile scaffold-like wooden construction with transparent paper inner walls. The outside of it is sheathed with black boards to resemble the Lipke's woodshed. In Judaism, sukkah is a temporary shelter whose religious significance is celebrated during Sukkot or the Feast of Booths. To Jews sukkah serves as a reminder of the tents and other fragile shelters of the ancient Israelites where they lived for forty years after God, with the help of Moses, had freed them from slavery in Egypt but had yet to bring them to the Promised Land. This joyful celebration takes place shortly after days of Yom Kippur fasting and repentance. Sukkah is a temporary shelter, and as such it must be simple to erect.

The author of art conception of the Memorial, Viktors Jansons, conceived of the sukkah as a symbolic double of the bunker, the temporary shelter that hangs in between the heaven and the earth. This tent stands for the fragility of life and its dependence on God, reminding that it is not the walls that provide security, it is the faith. On the thin walls of the sukkah artist Kristaps Ģelzis has drawn – with light strokes discernible only in good light – a landscape with a verdant valley at the height of the summer. This landscape that Ģelzis calls "a meditation" can be seen both as meditation on the Promised Land and a vision of a summer in the Latvian countryside before the war. It is nature in its primeval simplicity and beauty, an archetypical testimony to life, the source of life and constant rebirth. The drawing is dim and vague as an image that is stored only in memories, or conjured in one's imagination by hope and longing for freedom.

Above the sukkah on the attic level, there is an open hatch in the floor through which the lower two levels can be observed. The authors of the memorial consider it essential for the visitor to look at the real shelter, the bunker, and the symbolic shelter, the sukkah, from above. First of all, it implies looking back at the past from a point in the future where one no longer can discern details but has gained a perspective on the bigger picture: interconnections, immutable values, the intransient. Second, it resembles looking from the vantage point of view, the one of a narrator or, figuratively speaking, God, for we know that the people who found shelter in the bunker survived the war whereas at the time, they could only hope for such an outcome.

== Opening ==
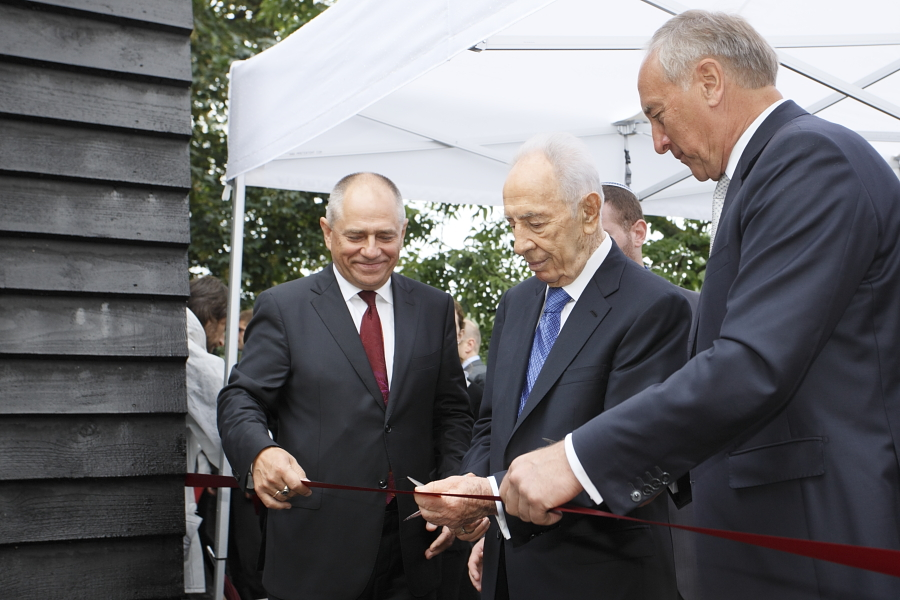
Opening ceremony of Žanis Lipke memorial in 2012; President of Israel Shimon Peres (in the middle), President of Republic of Latvia Andris Bērziņš (first from the right) and author of the idea of memorial, Māris Gailis

Construction of the memorial, which started in 2009, lasted for three years. The construction was funded solely by private donations and cost around €500,000 in total. In 2012 the memorial was officially opened by both president of Latvia Andris Bērziņš and the president of Israel, Shimon Peres.

Among the guests of the opening there were descendants of the saved Jews – representatives of the Smoļanski, Cesvaini and Lībheni families who came from Israel. Boriss Smoļanskis gave a speech during the opening ceremony and also deposited a relic of his family to the memorial – the Torah that belonged to his father Haims Smoļanskis, a close friend of Žanis Lipke. The Torah was preserved during the fateful events of the family – Jewish persecution, imprisonment in the ghettos and hiding places. Esther Schumacher and Jeanna Levitt, the daughters of Ābrams Lībhens who was also saved, brought a branch from the tree Žanis Lipke planted in Jerusalem in 1977 near Yad Vashem memorial.

== See also ==
- The Holocaust in Latvia
