= International School of Riga =

School in Riga, Latvia

- Rīgas Starptautiskā skola
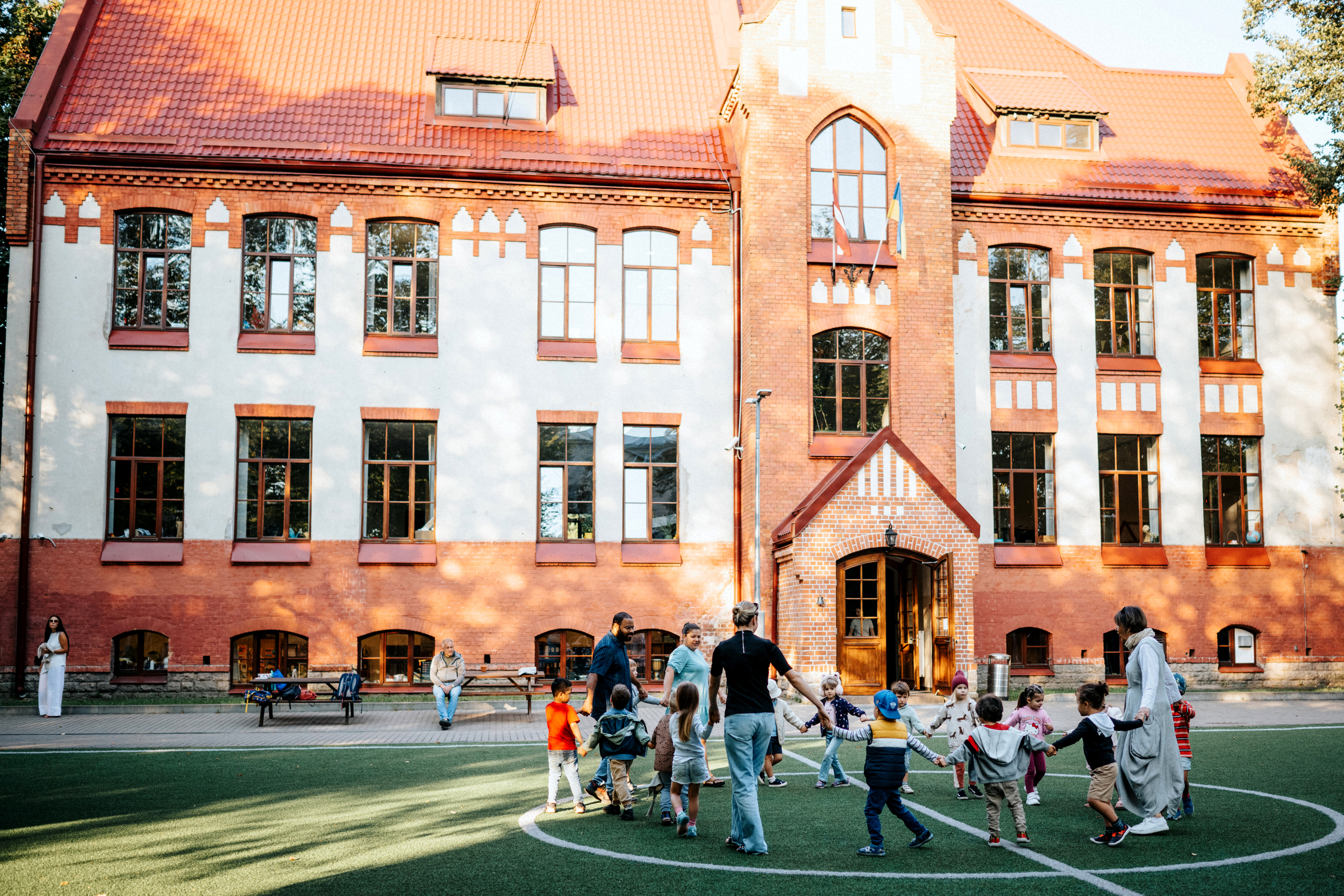
- School built in 1912 by architect Reinhold Georg Schmaeling.

Location
- Kalnciema Iela 118, Zemgales priekšpilsēta, Rīga, LV-1046, Latvia; Riga, Latvia, Riga
- Coordinates: 56°56′05″N 24°02′12″E

Information
- Established: 1995; 31 years ago
- Grades: From preschool to grade 12
- Age range: 2 to 18
- Campuses: Primary Campus: Kalnciema iela 118, Riga
- Campus: Secondary Campus: Skanstes iela 27, Riga
- Mascot: ISR Bears
- Accreditation: Council of International Schools, International Baccalaureate

The International School of Riga (ISR; Latvian: Rīgas Starptautiskā skola) is a non-profit, non-denominational, private international school located in Riga, Latvia. There are about 330 students from 47 different nationalities.

It provides preschool, primary, middle and high school education in English for children aged 2 to 18 (Preschool – Grade 12). ISR follows the International Baccalaureate Organization's IB Primary Years Programme (PYP) from Preschool to Grade 5. The middle school (Grades 6–10) follows IB Middle Years Programme (MYP), and in Grades 11 and 12, the prestigious IB Diploma Programme (IBDP). The school is authorised by the Latvian Ministry of Education and is fully accredited by the Council of International Schools.

== Campuses ==
ISR operates across two campuses:

- The Primary Campus is located at Kalnciema iela 118, housed in a restored 1912 school building designed by Latvian architect Reinholds Georgs Šmēlings. It serves students from early years through Grade 5.
- The Secondary Campus, opened in 2025, is a modern facility in central Riga (Skanstes iela 27), designed to accommodate the growth of the school’s Middle and High School programs.

== Curriculum ==
ISR offers a continuum of international programmes:

- IB Primary Years Programme (PYP) for Pre-Kindergarten to Grade 5
- IB Middle Years Programme (MYP), currently a candidate programme, for Grades 6–10
- IB Diploma Programme (DP) in Grades 11–12

English is the language of instruction. Latvian, French, Spanish, and English as an Additional Language (EAL) are also offered.

== Accreditation and Membership ==
ISR holds full accreditation from the Council of International Schools (CIS) and is authorized by the Latvian Ministry of Education. It is an official IB World School (IB code: 002334).

== Students and Community ==
The school hosts approximately 330 students (as of 2025–2026), from over 47 nationalities. The faculty consists of educators from diverse international backgrounds, with a majority holding advanced degrees and international teaching experience. ISR promotes a respectful, learning-focused community and places emphasis on character development, multilingualism, and global citizenship.

== Facilities ==
The primary campus includes 23 classrooms, music and art rooms, sports courts, green playgrounds, and an indoor gym. The secondary campus features upgraded science labs, collaboration spaces, a multipurpose hall, and access to nearby sports and recreation facilities.

== Co-curricular and Support Services ==
ISR offers over 40 after-school activities ranging from sports and STEM to creative arts and student leadership. Support services include learning support, counseling, university guidance, EAL, and standardized MAP Growth assessments. Transportation, meal plans (including vegetarian and allergy-sensitive options), and supervised after-school care until 18:00 are available.

== Governance ==
The school is governed by a Board of Directors elected by ISR Association members (parents/guardians of enrolled students). The Director and leadership team manage day-to-day operations.

== Mission ==
“We are a respectful, learning-focused community where each student is inspired to achieve their potential and to become an ethical, confident and internationally-minded citizen of tomorrow.”
