= German occupation of Latvia during World War II =

Part of the occupation of the Baltic states

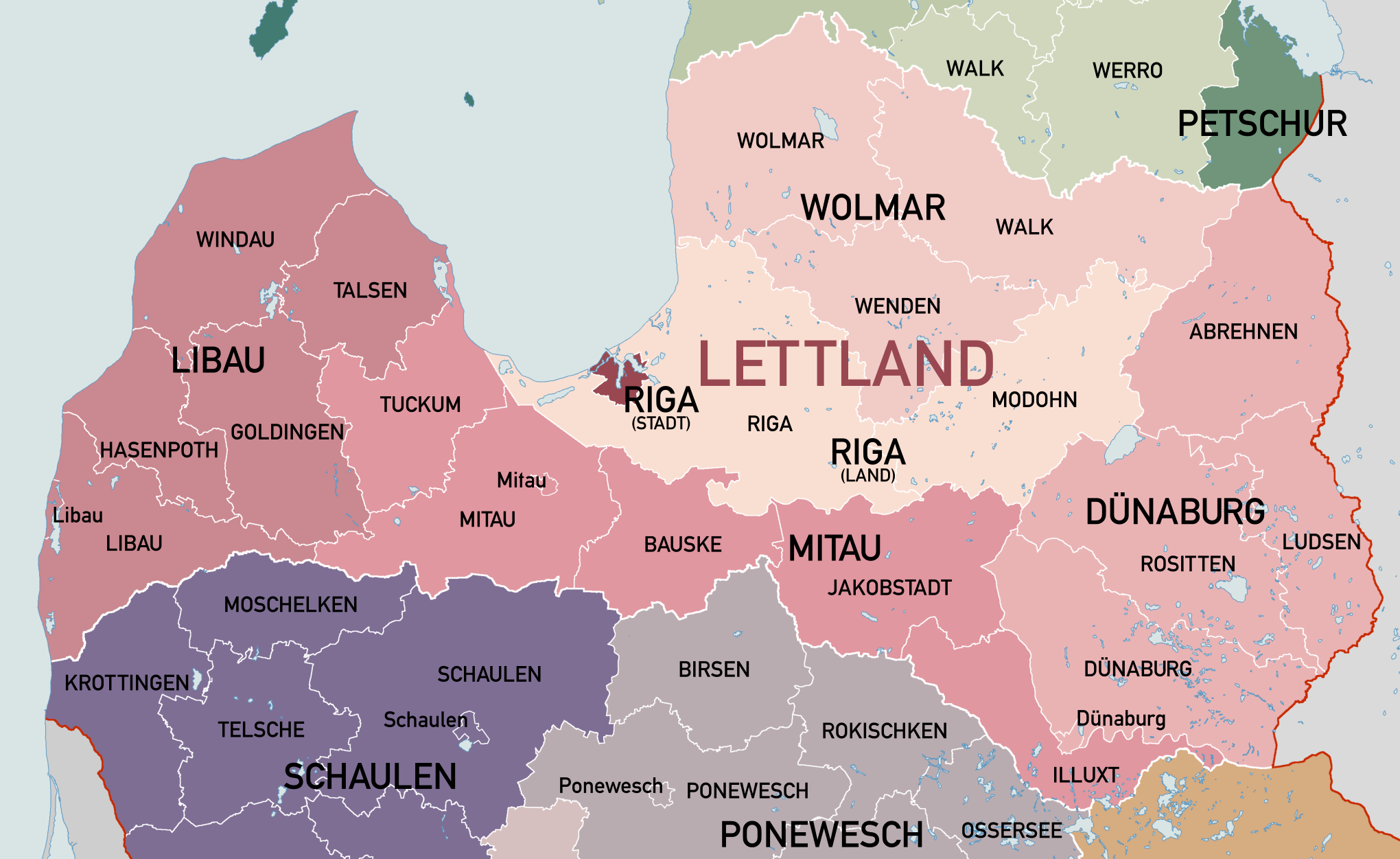
Occupied Latvia as the Generalbezirk Lettland with its subdivisions

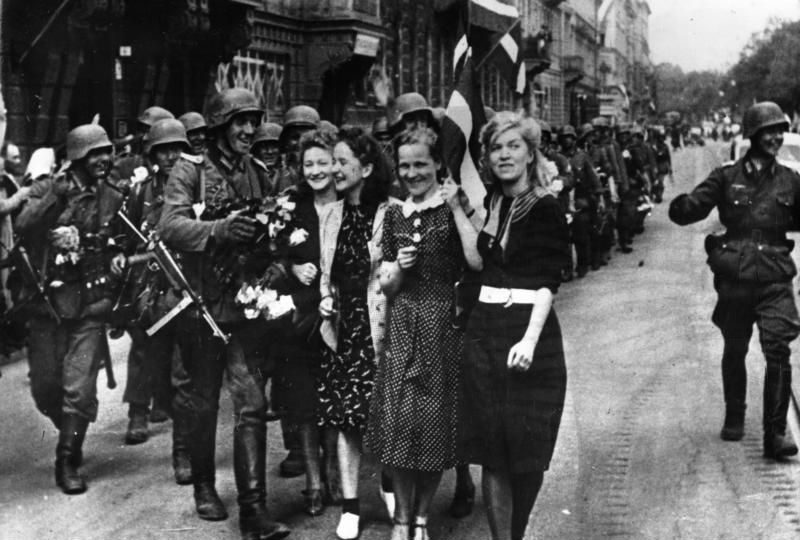
German soldiers enter Riga, July 1941

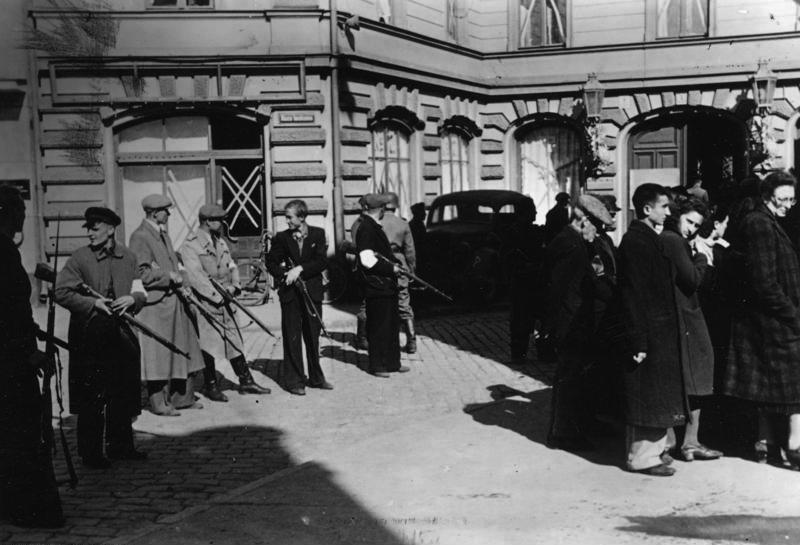
Members of the Latvian Auxiliary Police assemble a group of Jews, Liepāja, July, 1941.

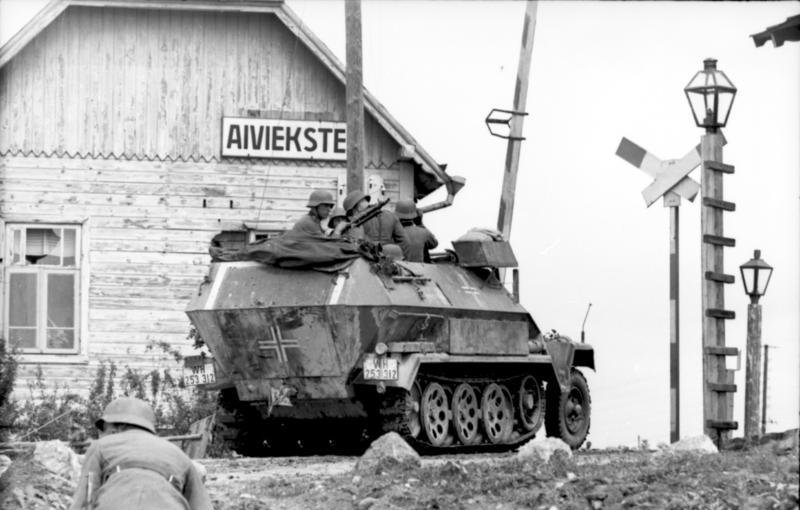
German halftrack at Aiviekste railroad station.

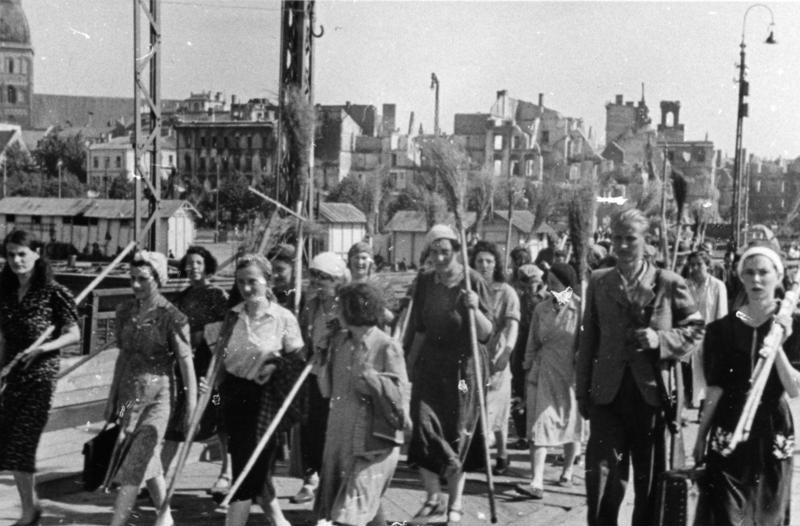
Clean-up team in destroyed Riga, July 1941

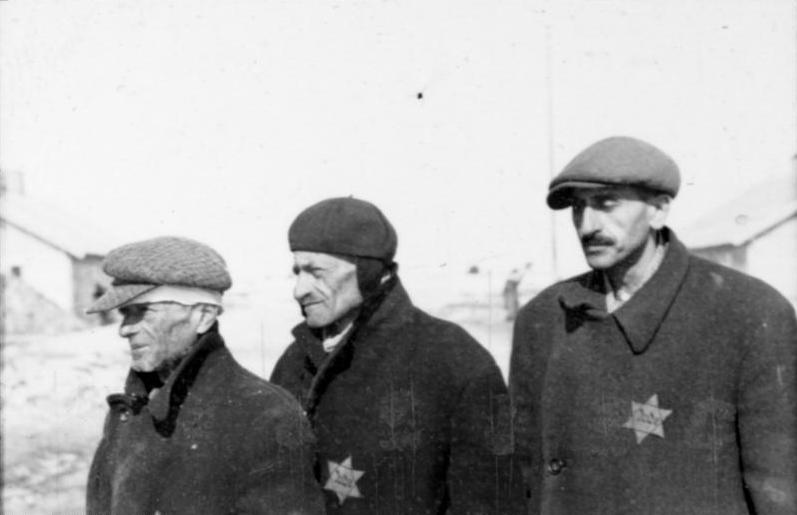
Jewish prisoners in Salaspils concentration camp

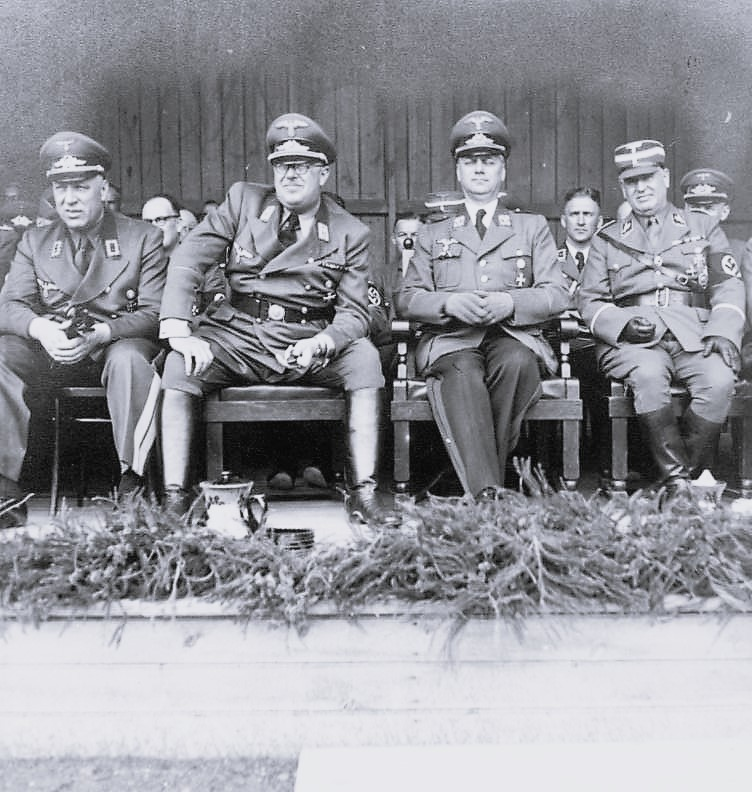
Reichsminister Alfred Rosenberg in occupied Latvia, 1942

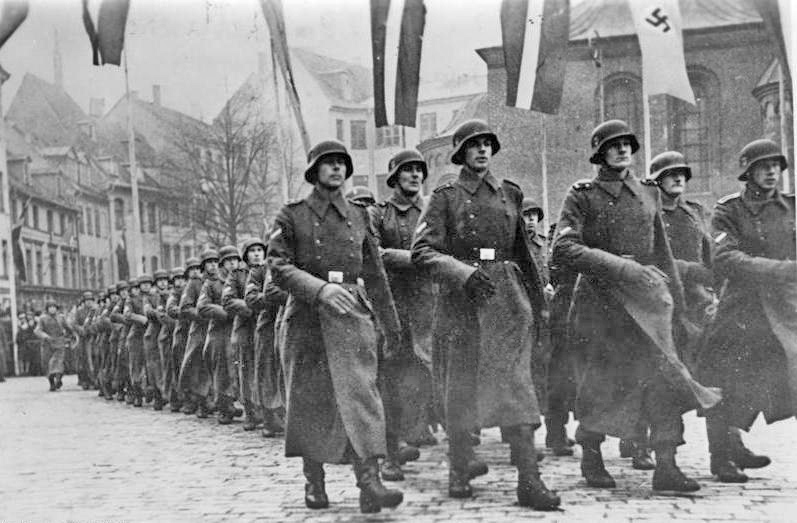
Latvian Legion on parade, November 1943

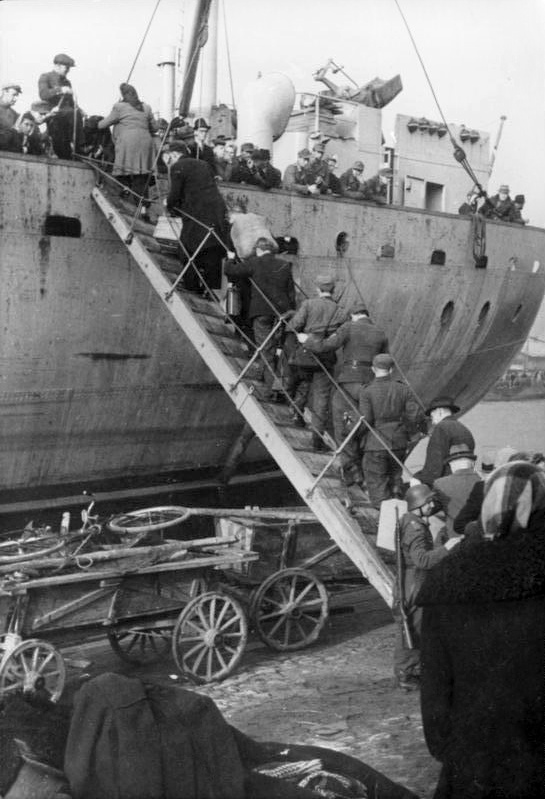
Refugees fleeing Ventspils, October 1944

The military occupation of Latvia by Nazi Germany was completed on 10 July 1941, by Germany's armed forces, as a part of the German occupation of the Baltic states during World War II.

Initially, the territory of Latvia was under the military administration of Army Group North, but on 25 July 1941, Latvia was incorporated as Generalbezirk Lettland, subordinated to Reichskommissariat Ostland, an administrative subdivision of Nazi Germany.

Anyone not racially acceptable or who opposed the German occupation, as well as those who had cooperated with the Soviet Union, was killed or sent to concentration camps in accordance with the Nazi Generalplan Ost.

== Persecutions ==
Immediately after the establishment of German authority at the beginning of July 1941, the elimination of the Jewish and Roma population began, with major mass killings taking place at Rumbula and elsewhere. The killings were committed by the Einsatzgruppe A, and the Wehrmacht. Latvian collaborators, including 500 to 1,500 members of the Arājs Kommando (which alone killed around 26,000 Jews) and other Latvian members of the SD, also were involved.

Some 30,000 Jews were shot in the autumn of 1941 and most of the remaining Jewish people were put into ghettos. In November and December 1941, the Riga Ghetto became crowded and to make room for the imminent arrival of German Jews, who were being shipped out of the country, all the remaining 30,000 Jews in Riga were taken from the ghetto to nearby Rumbula Forest, and shot.

Jews from Germany, Austria and the present-day Czech Republic, then in the Riga ghetto were put to work and placed on very reduced rations. The Kaiserwald concentration camp was built in 1943 at Mežaparks on the edge of Riga, and drew most of its inmates from the ghetto. In the camp, the inmates were put to work by large German companies. Before the Soviet forces returned, all Jews under 18 or over 30 were shot, with the remainder moved to Stutthof concentration camp.

During the years of Nazi occupation, special campaigns killed 90,000 people in Latvia, approximately 70,000 of whom were Jews and 2,000 Gypsies. Those who were not Jews or Gypsies were mostly civilians whose political opinions and activity were unacceptable to the German occupiers. Jewish and Gypsy civilians were eliminated as a result of the Nazi "theory of races" as set out in the Nazi Generalplan Ost plan.

== Resistance ==
Resistance in Latvia was very confusing: It included people resisting the Soviet occupation who were happy to work with the German forces, Soviet supporters resisting the German occupation, and nationalists resisting everyone who was occupying or trying to occupy Latvia. Some people changed sides when the Soviets started arresting and deporting people, others when Nazi soldiers started killing Latvians, and still others when the Soviet troops returned. Lastly the Jews resisted anyone trying to kill them, including both Latvians as well as Germans.

Many resistance fighters joined either the German or Soviet armies as a means of fighting. Very few were able to live as independent bands in the forests.

When the Germans first arrived in Latvia, they found anti-Soviet guerrilla bands operating in many areas, of varying quality, some swollen by deserters from Soviet units. The largest and most effective was led by Kārlis Aperāts who became a Standartenführer (full colonel) in the Waffen SS.

Some Latvians resisted the German occupation undertaking solo acts of bravery, like Žanis Lipke who risked his life to save more than 50 Jews.

The Latvian resistance movement was divided between the pro-independence units under the Latvian Central Council and the pro-Soviet forces under the Central Staff of the Partisan Movement in Moscow. Their Latvian commander was Arturs Sproģis. The Latvian Central Council published the outlawed publication Brīvā Latvija (Free Latvia). The periodical promoted the idea of renewing democracy in Latvia after the war.

Public displays of resistance such as on 15 May 1942 in Riga resulted in young nationalists being arrested, and others were stymied when their plans were discovered.

Partisan activity increased after Operation Winterzauber ("Winter Magic") by the Germans, who destroyed 99 villages in eastern Latvia, deported 6,000 of the villagers for forced labour, and shot 3,600 in early 1943. However, much partisan activity was centred on forcing civilians to provide food and shelter for the partisans rather than fighting Germans.

Soviet-supporting partisans, many of whom were actually Soviet soldiers operating behind the lines, sent messages to Moscow making wild claims of success, for instance that 364 trains were destroyed, none of which bear any resemblance to German reports. These "reports" were used as propaganda by the Soviets.

Resistance continued at an increased level after the return of the Red Army in July 1944, with perhaps 40,000 Latvians involved and around 10,000 active at any point in time.

== Latvians in the German army ==
Nazi Germany on arrival in Latvia looked to recruit Latvian units in accordance with the Generalplan Ost, which required the population of Latvia to be cut by 50%, they quickly located Viktors Arājs who was leading a unit that became known as the Arajs Kommando. It became infamous for its actions against the Jewish population, such as burning the Riga synagogues with people inside and the Rumbula massacre. The 500 men executed an estimated 26,000 Jews, Gypsies and others deemed undesirable.

Latvian Auxiliary Police battalions were raised from volunteer. The first unit sent to the front was involved in heavy fighting in June 1942 and acquitted itself well. Latvians however wanted to raise a Latvian Legion, under the command of Latvian officers, and offered to raise an army of 100,000. In January 1943, short of troops, Hitler agreed. This took away the need to conscript Latvian men, which would have been an illegal act. So was born the 15th Waffen Grenadier Division of the SS (1st Latvian).

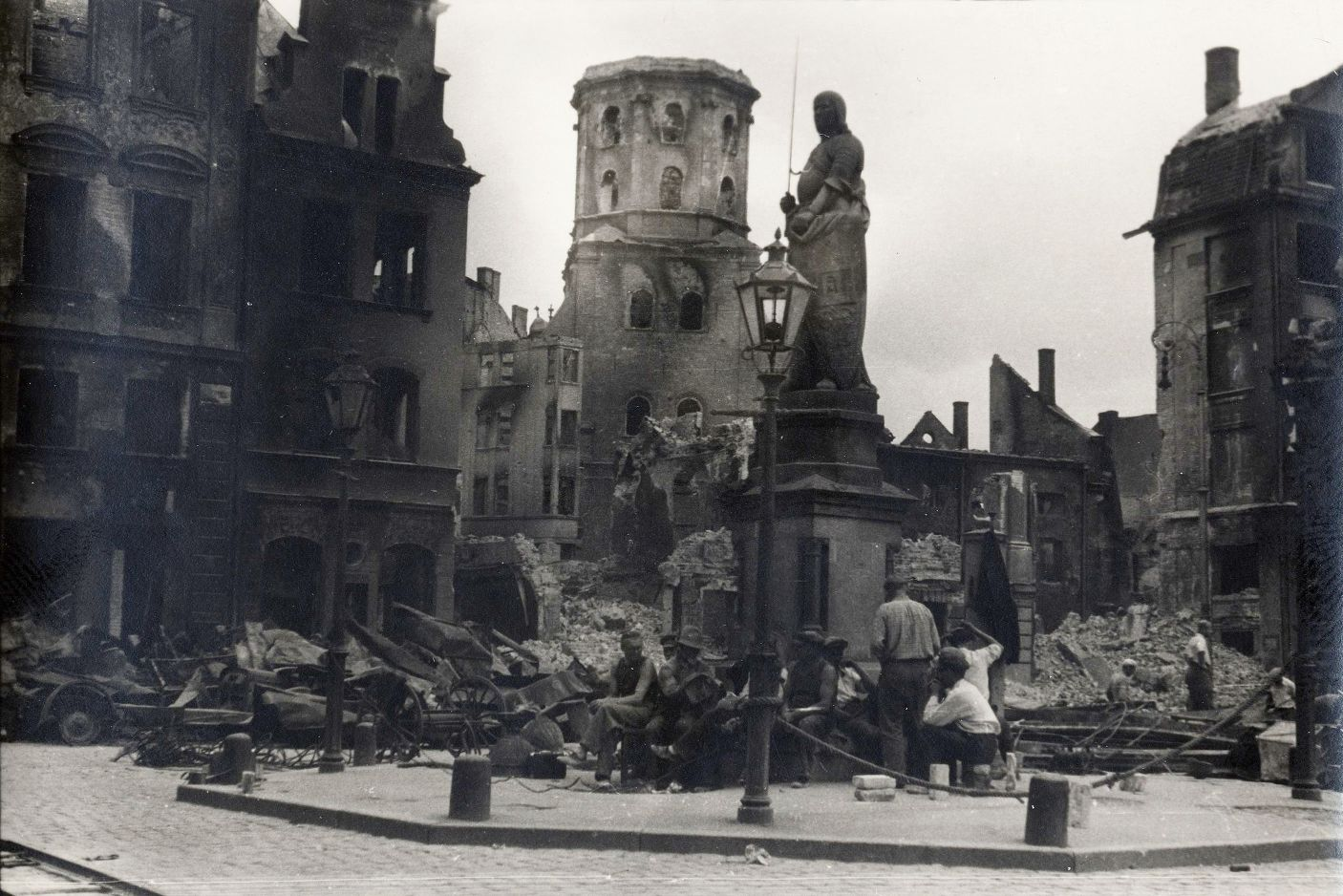
Destroyed St. Peter's church in Riga

Two police battalions fighting near Leningrad with Dutch and Flemish soldiers were pulled back in May 1943 and with reinforcements from Latvia and a change of uniform, transformed into the 2nd Latvian SS Volunteer Brigade and made part of 2nd SS Infantry Brigade. The senior Latvian commander, Lt Col Voldemārs Veiss, was awarded the Knight's Cross of the Iron Cross in January 1944. The brigade was expanded into the 19th Waffen Grenadier Division of the SS (2nd Latvian) in January 1944.

== Defeat and retreat of Nazi forces ==
On 12 January 1944, the latest Red Army assault managed to lift the 900-day Siege of Leningrad, during which over one million people died, and on 20 January, German troops started to retreat.

The re-conquering of the Baltic area was undertaken as a direct follow-through of the assault that started in Leningrad, entering Estonia in early February, along with much of Ukraine and Belarus. Nazi Germany began to suffer regular defeats on the eastern front and was pushed back to the west.

The 2nd Latvian SS Brigade, which was now upgraded to the 19th Waffen Grenadier Division of the SS (2nd Latvian), was among those fighting before the spring thaw slowed the attacks. On 22 June, the third anniversary of the German invasion was chosen as the start date for Operation Bagration. The massive Soviet attack was catastrophic for the German armies who fell back before the onslaught. In mid-July 1944 the Soviet Army once again crossed Latvia's pre-war eastern border, and the Soviet armies continued westward leaving sufficient troops to block in the remaining German forces until they attacked on 11 September as a diversion for an attack in Estonia. On 9 October Riga was in artillery range of the Red Army. German troops, including the 19th Waffen Grenadier Division of the SS (2nd Latvian) under the code name Donner (Thunder), withdrew from Riga, destroying bridges as they went. Battles were quite bloody but by 13 October 1944 the Soviets had re-captured Riga. By mid October, the German Army, which partly included the "Latvian Legion", was besieged in Kurzeme, in the "Courland Pocket".

Some 200,000 German troops held out in Courland, trapped between the Baltic Sea and the Soviet lines while the Soviet Army concentrated its attacks on East Prussia, Silesia, Pomerania, and ultimately Berlin. Colonel-General Heinz Guderian, chief of the German General Staff, insisted that the troops in Courland be evacuated by sea and used to defend the Reich. However, Hitler refused and ordered the German forces in Courland to hold out. He believed them necessary to protect German submarine bases along the Baltic coast. On 15 January 1945, Army Group Courland (German: Heeresgruppe Kurland) was formed under Colonel-General Dr. Lothar Rendulic. Until the end of the war, Army Group Courland (including divisions such as the Latvian Freiwiliger SS Legion) successfully defended the area in which they were besieged. It held out until 8 May 1945, when Colonel-General Carl Hilpert, the army group's last commander, surrendered to Marshal Leonid Govorov. At this time, the group consisted of some 31 divisions of varying strength. Approximately 200,000 troops of Army Group Courland surrendered, including 14,000 Latvian soldiers. They were deported to Soviet prison camps in the east after their surrender on 9 May.

Many Latvians fled this battlefield in fishing boats and ships to Sweden and Germany, from whence they emigrated, mostly to Australia and North America. Approximately 150,000 Latvians went into exile in the West.

== Aftermath of the Second World War ==
During World War II, more than 200,000 Latvian soldiers ended up in the rank and file of both occupation forces; approximately half of them (100,000) were killed on the battlefield.

It is estimated that, as a result of the war, the population of Latvia decreased from 500,000 to 300,000 (a 25% decrease compared to 1939). The war also heavily damaged the economy: Many historic cities were destroyed as well as industry and infrastructure.

As of 1940, most western governments did not recognise the incorporation of Latvia and the other Baltic States into the Soviet Union. The only exception was Sweden, which returned the members of the "Latvian Legion", who had ended up in Sweden at the end of the war, to the USSR, and handed the diplomatic representative offices of the Baltic countries in Stockholm to the USSR. After the war, the United States applied the most persistent pressure on the Soviet Union regarding the Baltic States' wish for independence. Throughout the entire period of occupation, the embassy of independent Latvia continued to function in Washington, D.C., and London.

== See also ==
- Molotov–Ribbentrop Pact
- Latvian resistance movement
- Generalbezirk Lettland
- Reichskommissariat Ostland
- Rumbula
- 15th Waffen Grenadier Division of the SS (1st Latvian)
- 19th Waffen Grenadier Division of the SS (2nd Latvian)
- Luftwaffen-Legion Lettland
- Occupation of Baltic republics by Nazi Germany
- Occupation of Baltic states (by Nazi Germany and the USSR, 1939–1991)
- Soviet occupation of Latvia in 1940
