= Vanšu Bridge =

Bridge in Riga, Latvia

Vanšu Bridge Vanšu tilts
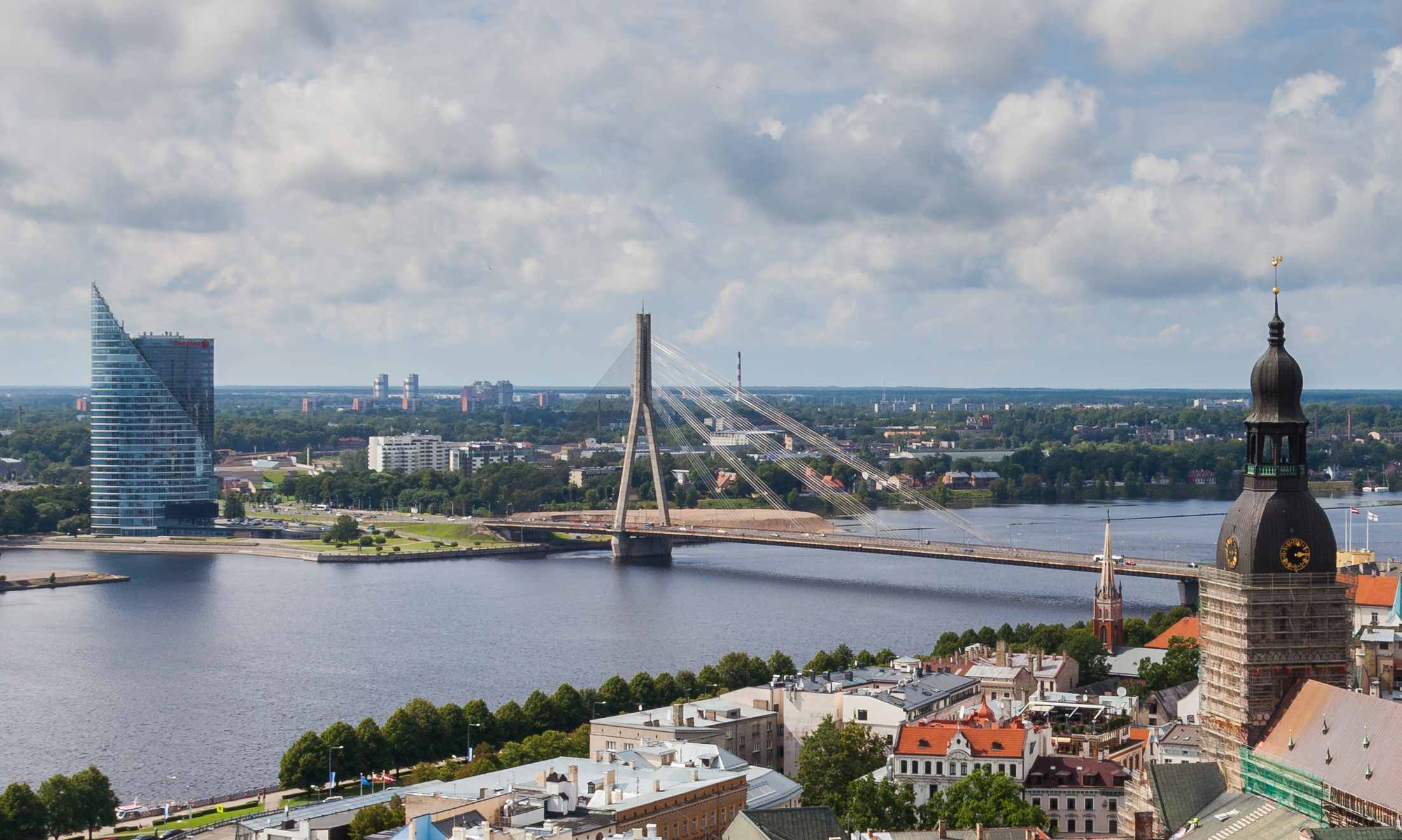
- Coordinates: 56°57′04″N 24°05′43″E
- Crosses: Daugava
- Locale: Riga, Latvia
- Other name: Until 1991 Gorky Bridge

Characteristics
- Design: cable-stayed bridge
- Material: Steel, concrete
- Total length: 625 metres (2,051 ft)
- Width: 28 metres (92 ft)
- Height: 109 metres (358 ft)
- Longest span: 312 metres (1,024 ft)
- No. of spans: 2

History
- Opened: 1981

Location
- Interactive map of Vanšu Bridge

The Vanšu Bridge (Latvian: Vanšu tilts) in Riga is a cable-stayed bridge that crosses the Daugava river in Riga, the capital of Latvia. The word vanšu refers to the cables suspending its deck, comparing them to nautical rigging also known as shrouds in English; thus a direct translation of the name is Shroud Bridge. 595 meters in length, it is one of five bridges crossing the Daugava in Riga and passes over Ķīpsala island. It was built during the Soviet period and opened to public use on 21 July 1981 as the Gorky Bridge (Latvian: Gorkija tilts) after Maxim Gorky street, today renamed Krišjānis Valdemārs street, which it extends across the river.

In the last decade there have been more than 10 instances of people attempting to climb the cables. The only one with lethal consequences was on 7 June 2012, when a man committed suicide by jumping down from the bridge's cables. After the incident Riga City Council ordered for barbed wire entanglements to be installed on the cables.

In 2013 a beach with a playground and volleyball field was opened next to the Vanšu bridge in Ķīpsala.

== Gallery ==

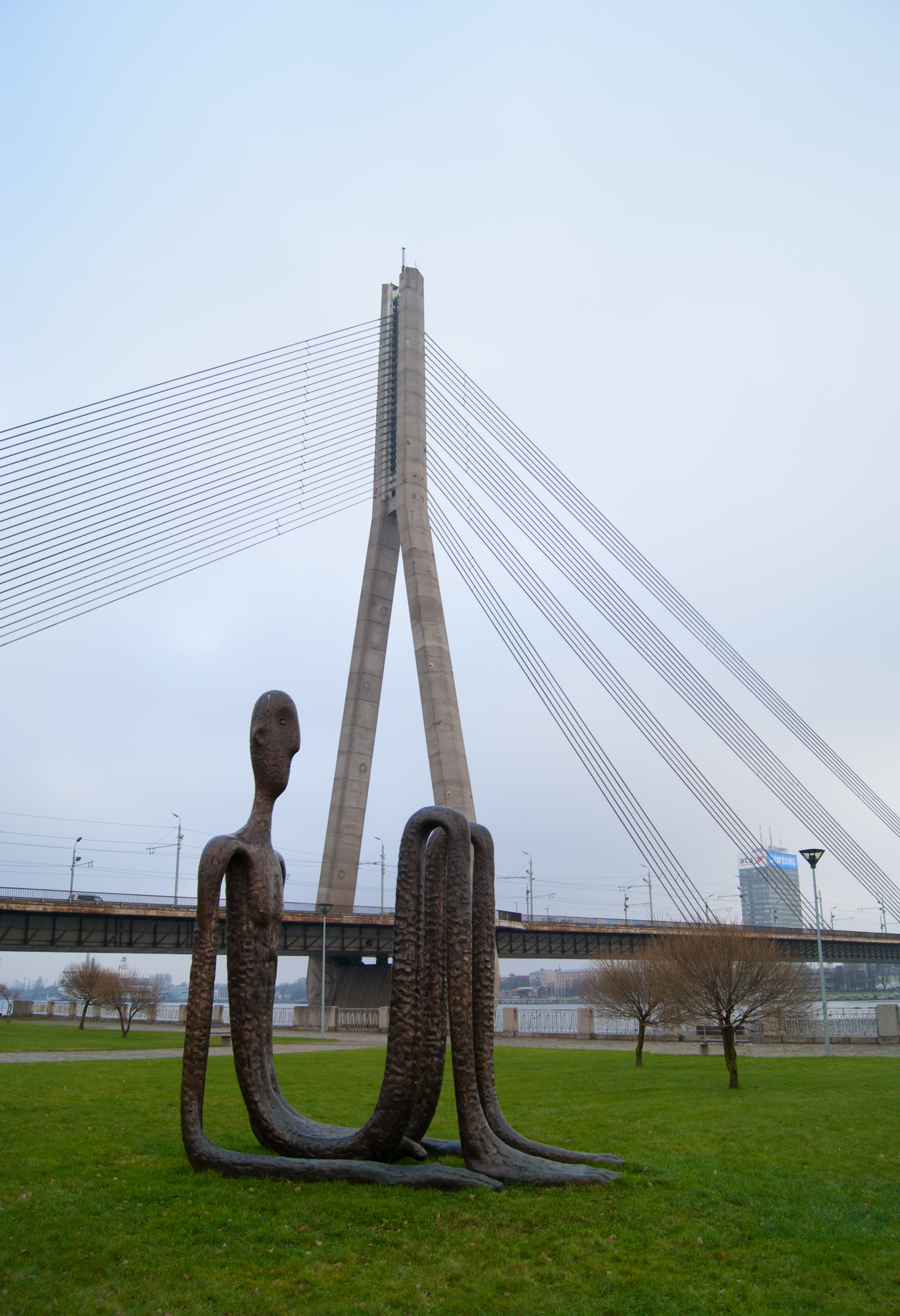
