= Imants Sudmalis =

Latvian politician and Soviet partisan

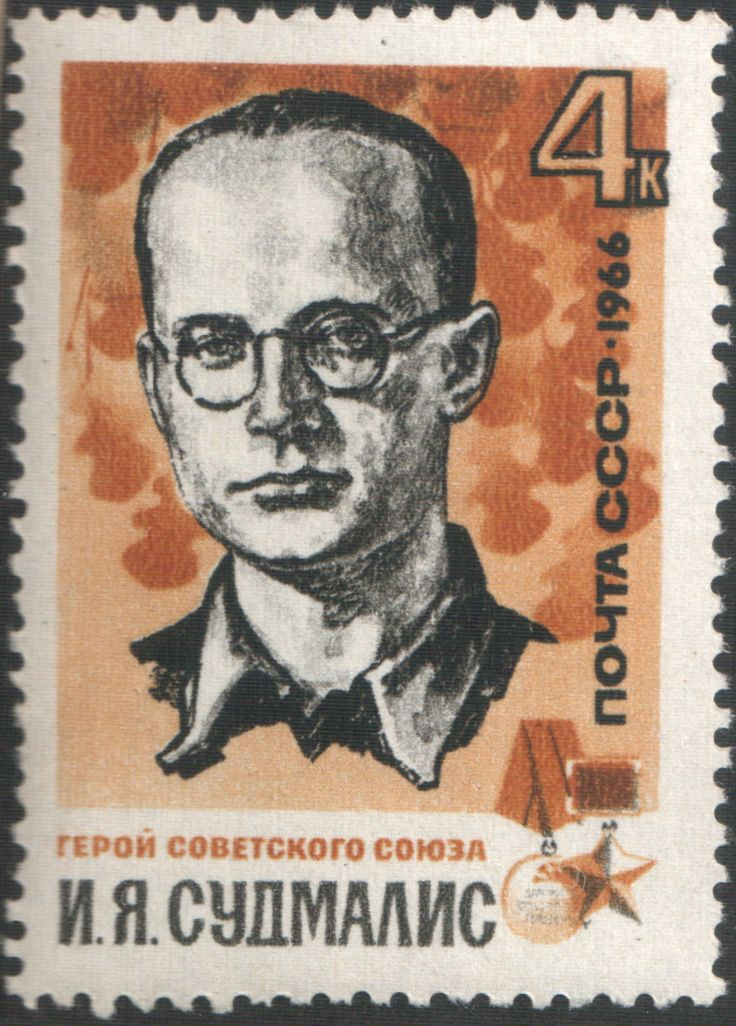
Imants Sudmalis depicted on 1966 Soviet postage stamp

Imants Sudmalis (18 March 1916 OS, Cēsis, Governorate of Livonia, Russian Empire – 25 May 1944 NS, Riga, Latvia) was a Latvian editor and Soviet communist and partisan, the Hero of the Soviet Union (awarded posthumously on October 23, 1957).

== Life and career ==
Sudmalis was born in to the family of a teacher.

A Communist sympathizer from a young age, Sudmalis became a member of the underground Communist Union of the Youth of Latvia from 1932, and head of the underground Komsomol organization in Liepāja during the dictatorship of Kārlis Ulmanis. He was jailed for his pro-Soviet agitation but was released following the Soviet occupation in 1940. He became a member of the Latvian Lenin Communist Youth Central Committee and secretary for its Liepāja branch and was editor of Liepāja's party newspaper, Komunists ("The Communist").

During the Nazi occupation in World War II, Sudmalis was one of the organisers of the Soviet guerrilla resistance movement in the territory of Latvia. Soviet sources indicate he participated in the defense of Liepāja in June 1941, fighting with his Komsomol group against the German invasion forces, destroying a Nazi landing party near Rucava. Ultimately, the Soviets evacuated Liepāja two days before the Nazis entered the city. From 1943, Sudmalis was in charge of an underground Komsomol resistance cell in Riga. In February 1944, he was executed by the Germans. He was awarded with two Orders of Lenin.

== Soviet commemorations ==
On 23 November 1978 a monument dedicated to Sudmalis was erected in Liepāja on Komsomol Square (Latvian: Komjaunatnes laukums; present-day Jānis Čakste Square). The sculptors of the monument were Vilnis Albergs and Gaida Grundberga; its architects were O. Ostenbergs and I. Strautmanis. Following the restoration of Latvia's independence, on 21 July 1995 the statue of Sudmalis was relocated to the park of the Liepāja Museum. One of the driving forces behind the move was local LNNK activist Voldemārs Prancāns, who disliked the fact that the monument had become a meeting place for the local Interfront and others who had opposed Latvia's renewed independence from the USSR.

A bronze bust of Imants Sudmalis once stood in Riga near the Riga Castle, but was dismantled in the 1990s. There is also a memorial stone to Sudmalis (erected in 1962) at the Draudzības kurgāns (Burial-mound of Friendship) near Zilupe on the Latvian–Russian–Belarusian border.

Schools, Pioneer youth organizations, streets, kolhozes, and a vessel in the Soviet fishing fleet were named for Sudmalis. In 1968 an oil tanker built in Kerch was named for him. As of 2006 this tanker sailed under the flag of Belize.
