= Latvian Central Council =

Latvian pro-independence resistance group in WWII

- Latvijas Centrālā padome
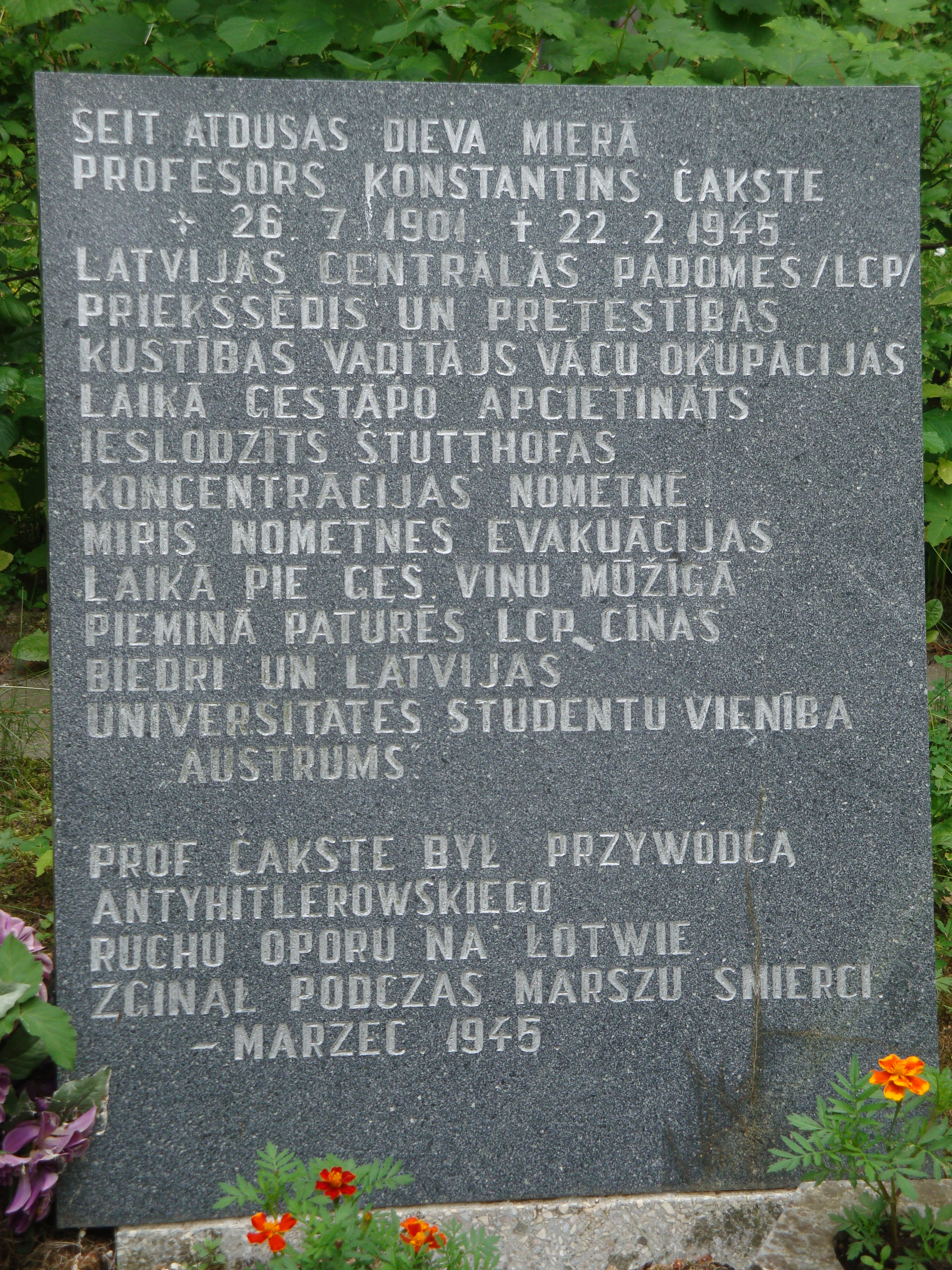
- The epitaph of the chairman of the LCC Konstantīns Čakste in Krepa Kaszubska, Poland
- Founder: Konstantīns Čakste
- Leaders: Konstantīns Čakste; General Verners Tepfers; Jāzeps Rancāns
- Dates active: 1943–1951
- Dissolved: 1994
- Allegiance: Latvia
- Wars: World War II

The Latvian Central Council (LCC, Latvian: Latvijas Centrālā Padome, LCP) was the pro-independence Latvian resistance movement during World War II from 1943 onwards. The LCC consisted of members from across the spectrum of former leading Latvian politicians and aimed to be the governing body of a democratic Republic of Latvia after the war. Its military units were an alternative to the Soviet partisans also operating in Latvia.

Latvia had gained its independence from Russia at the end of World War I, but in June 1940 the country was occupied by the Red Army and in August 1940 it was forcibly incorporated into the Soviet Union. In June 1941, Nazi Germany invaded the Soviet Union and by July of that year it had overrun Latvia and incorporated the country into Germany’s eastern empire. Latvians resisted both Soviet and German occupation and sought to restore their independence. The Latvian Central Council was founded on August 13, 1943 by members of the four biggest Latvian political parties- the Latvian Social Democratic Workers' Party, Democratic Centre, Latvian Farmers Union and the Latgalian Christian Farmers party. These men survived the Soviet terror and now strove to restore the democratic Republic of Latvia. Konstantīns Čakste, the son of the 1st President of Latvia, Jānis Čakste, was elected as the chairman with deputies Pauls Kalniņš and Ludvigs Sēja as general secretary. Seven commissions were made for most important sectors like defense, foreign affairs and finances.

On March 17, 1944, 189 Latvian political leaders and public figures signed the Memorandum of the Latvian Central Council, which declared the urgent need to restore the de facto sovereignty of the Republic of Latvia and create a Latvian government. The memorandum was a call to resist the reoccupation of Latvia by the Soviet Union following the defeat of Germany, which by that time was widely expected. The memorandum was drawn up in several original copies and photographically reproduced with the aim of taking it out of Latvia and getting it into the hands of the governments of the Western allies and the German occupation government.

On 8 September 1944 in Riga, the leadership of the Latvian Central Council adopted a Declaration on the Restoration of the Republic of Latvia. The adoption of the Declaration was an attempt to restore de facto independence of the Republic of Latvia, in hopes of international support and by taking advantage of the interval between changes of occupying powers. The Declaration prescribed that the Satversme is the fundamental law of the restored Republic of Latvia, and provided for establishment of a Cabinet of Ministers that would organise the restoration of the State of Latvia.

Some of the most prominent LCC accomplishments are related to its military branch – the group led by General Jānis Kurelis (the so-called “Kurelieši”) with Lieutenant Roberts Rubenis' battalion which carried out the armed resistance against Waffen SS forces. Moreover, LCC helped Latvians escape to Sweden by boat in 1943-45 from Courland in Western Latvia, thereby rescuing thousands including Jews.

On 3 October 1945 the Latvian Central Council in Lustenau (Austria) held its first meeting. After the death of Dr. Pauls Kalniņš on 27 August 1945, the chairing of the LCC was undertaken by Bishop Jāzeps Rancāns, the former Deputy Speaker of the Latvian Parliament. The CC Latvia comprised the officials of the Presidium of the Parliament and the largest parties of the pre-war Latvia, its headquarters were located in Esslingen.

The LCC prepared several petitions and memorandums on the policies of the Bolshevik and Nazi occupation powers in Latvia and submitted them to the governments of the important western powers. Bishop J. Rancāns and other LCC members repeatedly visited American and British occupation authorities in Germany to achieve improvement of the situation of former Latvian soldiers and refugees. Authorised by the LCC, they arrived at international conferences where the arrangement of the post-war Europe was decided, to unofficially inform the representatives of western powers on issues related to the Latvian state and its citizens.

The Latvian Central Council established contacts with Lithuanian and Estonian political organisations to apply common efforts in the fight against the occupation regime in the Baltic States.

== See also ==
- Latvian Diplomatic Service
