= Jānis Lipke =

Latvian rescuer of Jews during the Holocaust

- Born: 1 February 1900; Mitau, Courland Governorate, Russian Empire (now Jelgava, Latvia)
- Died: 14 May 1987 (aged 87); Riga, Latvian SSR, USSR (now Latvia)
- Resting place: Forest Cemetery, Riga
- Other name: Žanis Lipke
- Occupation: Dock worker
- Known for: Saving Jews during the Holocaust
- Spouse: Johana Lipke
- Children: 3
- Awards: Righteous Among the Nations

Jānis Lipke (also Žanis and Jan Lipke; 1 February 1900, Mitau – 14 May 1987, Riga) was a Latvian rescuer of Jews in Riga in World War II from the Holocaust in Latvia.

Lipke, a dock worker in the port of Riga, was determined to help save Latvian Jews from capture by the Nazis after witnessing actions against them in the streets. He retrained in order to become a contractor for the Luftwaffe, and then used his position to smuggle Jewish workers out of the Riga Ghetto and camps in and around Riga, whom he concealed with the aid of his wife Johanna until the arrival of the Red Army in October 1944. The Lipkes and their various helpers saved forty people in this way, one-fifth of the approximately 200 Jews who survived the war in Latvia.

When Lipke died in 1987, the Jews of Riga arranged his funeral.

== Honors ==
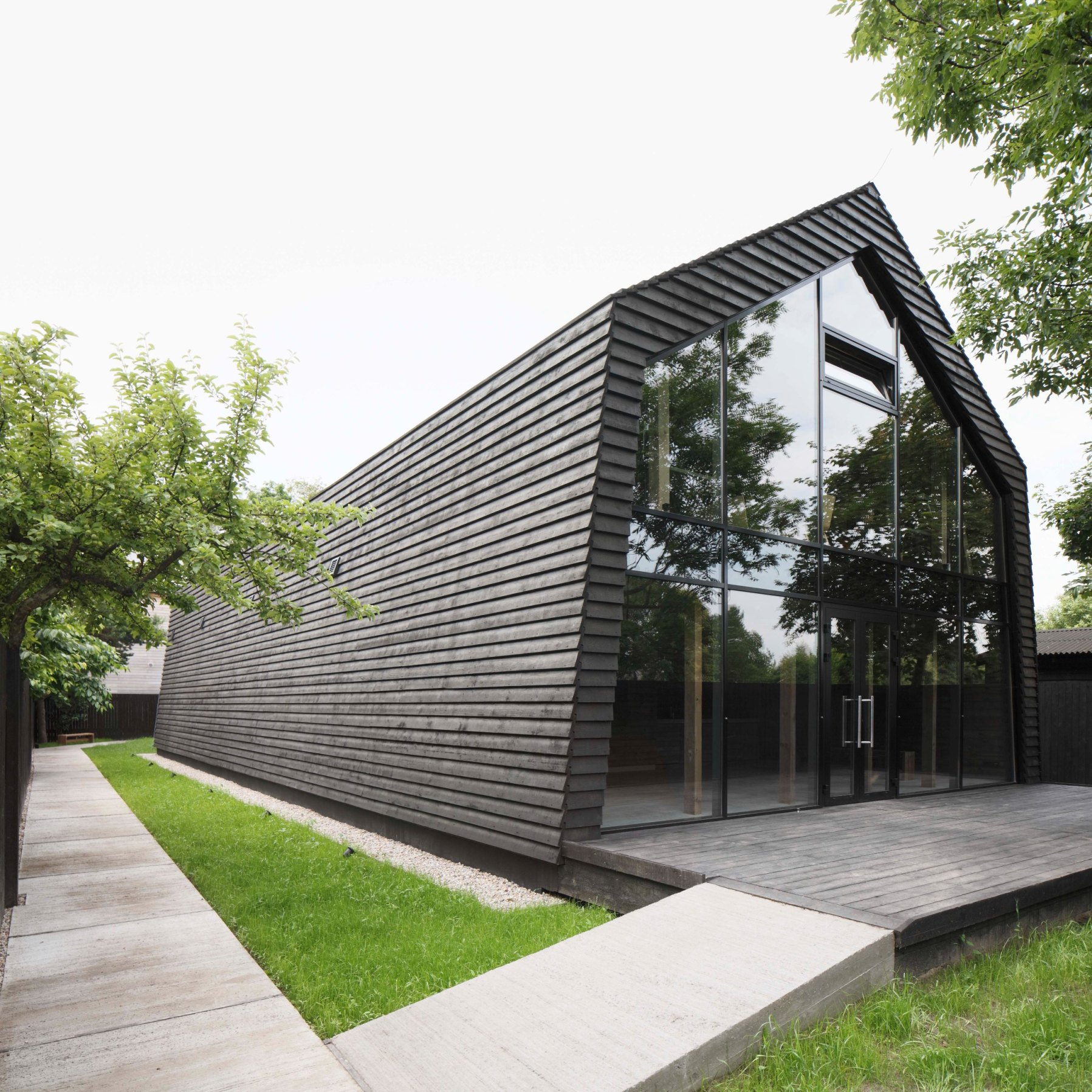
Žanis Lipke Memorial in Ķīpsala

Yad Vashem honored Lipke and his wife as Righteous Among the Nations on 28 June 1966.

On 4 July 2007, the day of remembrance of the victims of genocide against the Jewish nation, a monument commemorating those who saved Latvian Jews, in particular Lipke, was unveiled at Riga's Great Choral Synagogue.

The Žanis Lipke Memorial is located on the island of Ķīpsala in Riga, at 9 Mazais Balasta dambis. It was built next to Lipke's home, where he had arranged a shelter for rescued Jews.

The 2018 Latvian film The Mover portrays the efforts of Lipke and his wife to rescue Jews.
