= Vassili Kononov =

Soviet partisan

Vassili Makarovich Kononov or Vasiliy Makarovich Kononov (Russian: Василий Макарович Кононов, Latvian: Vasilijs Kononovs; 1 January 1923 – 31 March 2011) was a Soviet partisan during World War II, who was convicted by the Supreme Court of Latvia as a war criminal. He is the only former Soviet partisan convicted of crimes against humanity.

Kononov was convicted for his role in three deaths in Mazie Bati, a Latvian village where local inhabitants had denounced alleged partisans who were then killed by German troops. A short time later Kononov led a unit, posing as German Wehrmacht personnel, into the village and killed nine civilians, including three women, one in the late stages of pregnancy who was burned alive. A Latvian court declared the killing of the three women a war crime. The conviction was later overturned on the grounds that it was not clearly established whether Kononov was operating on occupied territory and whether he and his men could be considered combatants, as well as whether the villagers could be considered prisoners of war. An appeal by the prosecutor to the Supreme Court of Latvia was dismissed.

== Mazie Bati ==
On 29 February 1944, Latvian villagers from Mazie Bati (in Russian sources: Малые Баты (Malye Baty)) allowed 12 men from the Soviet reconnaissance-sabotage group to stay in their barns. The next day, at six in the morning, the Germans, who Kononov suspected the villagers of aiding, burned and machine-gunned the barns. All 12 partisans, including the leader Major Chugunov, his wife Antonina and their 7-month-old son, were killed.

On 27 May 1944, a detachment of the Soviet First Latvian Partisan Battalion led by Kononov staged a "counter operation" against the village of Mazie Bati. In this operation, nine villagers were accused of being the "German auxiliaries" (the Latvian armed resistance against the Soviet occupation of Latvia sided with the German invaders in 1941) responsible for the prior incident. Kononov's men were sent to capture the villagers pursuant to an ad-hoc Military Tribunal verdict.

Kononov and his men conducted the operation wearing German Wehrmacht uniforms so as not to arouse the suspicion of the villagers. Nine villagers were killed, including three women, one in the late stages of pregnancy who was burned alive. Buildings were burned as well.

== War crime prosecution ==
=== Original conviction and dismissal ===
In July 1998, original proceedings against Kononov were commenced by the Latvian Principal Public Prosecutor's Office, whereby in August 1998 he was formally charged and ultimately indicted in December 1998. Kononov pleaded not guilty at the trial which began in January 1999. Ample evidence of guilt was found by the court where Kononov was in violation of the Charter of the International Military Tribunal ("IMT") Nuremberg, the Hague Convention (IV) 1907 and the Geneva Convention (IV) 1949. He was found guilty and sentenced to six years imprisonment.

On 25 April 2000, the Criminal Affairs Division in Latvia overturned his conviction on the grounds that it was not clearly established whether Kononov was operating on occupied territory and whether he and his men could be considered combatants, as well as whether the villagers could be considered prisoners of war based on their armament by the Germans. On 27 June 2000, the Supreme Court of Latvia dismissed the prosecutor's appeal, ultimately setting Kononov free.

=== Second investigation and conviction ===
On 17 May 2001, Kononov was once again charged by the prosecutor's office following a new investigation. The deaths of six men were deemed justifiable, but the deaths of the three women were deemed an act of banditry, in violation of the law, but ultimately barred by statute of limitations. The prosecution appealed and on 30 April 2004, the decision of the lower court was overturned and Kononov was found guilty of war crimes, and subsequently jailed. On 28 September 2004, the Supreme Court upheld the verdict of the court in dismissing Kononov's appeal.

==== Appeal to the European Court of Human Rights ====
On 19 June 2008, Kononov's lawyer Mikhail Ioffe, announced that the European Court of Human Rights had overturned the Latvian court ruling. He also said that Kononov was seeking €5,187,000 in compensation for the two and a half years his client spent in a Latvian prison.

A press release published by the Court on 24 July 2008 revealed the Court's decision, establishing, by four votes to three, that the Kononov's case presented a violation of Article 7 (no retrospective punishment) of the European Convention on Human Rights. Kononov was awarded €30,000 in respect of non-pecuniary damages.

On 14 October 2008, the government of Latvia decided to appeal the 24 July judgment. On 9 February 2009, the case Kononov v. Latvia was referred to the Grand Chamber of the European Court of Human Rights. In May 2009, Lithuania joined Latvia using its right to participate in the case.

===== Final ruling =====
In May 2010, the Grand Chamber ruled, by 14 votes to 3, that the case presented no violation of Article 7 ECHR. Under the Hague Regulations of 1907, the court determined Kononov could be punished for failing to meet the regulation criteria, specifically, wearing German Wehrmacht uniforms while carrying out the crimes. The court determined the execution of the villagers was in violation of established international law at the time, as Kononov was only entitled to arrest them, and his conviction was not barred by statute of limitations.

==== Support from Russia and activist groups ====
At various times throughout the period of his prosecution for alleged war crimes, Kononov has received official support from the Government of Russia. In April 2000, immediately before judgement was to be handed down in his appeal with the Supreme Court of Latvia, he was offered citizenship of the Russian Federation by President Vladimir Putin. Kononov accepted the offer, which entailed giving up his previously held Latvian citizenship. On the event of his 80th birthday in 2003, Kononov received personal greetings from the Russian President, delivered at a ceremony held in the Russian Embassy in Riga.

In the hearings of his case at the ECHR, Russia acted as a third party. Sergey Mironov, speaker of the Federation Council of Russia, expressed hopes that President Dmitry Medvedev's Historical Truth Commission would also become involved in the Kononov case.

In November 2000, a Latvian group named the Young Communists carried out an attack on a branch railway in Riga to protest the imprisonment of Kononov and fellow ex-Soviet partisan Mikhail Farbtukh. The Kononov affair also drew the involvement of various nationalist and far-right groups. For instance, the Latvian branch of the National Bolshevik Party (with Vladimir Linderman as one of its leading figures) campaigned for Kononov from 1998 onwards. Two different groups of National Bolsheviks crossed the border from Russia into Latvia to protest Kononov's imprisonment. In November 2000, one of these groups tried to blow up the tower of St. Peter's Church in Riga, barricading themselves on the tower's observation deck and threatening to set off explosives. In addition to this widespread support from Russian nationalists, the Israeli far-right group Be’ad Artzeinu (composed of ethnic Russians and tied to Avigdor Eskin) launched a pro-Kononov protest outside the Latvian embassy in Tel Aviv in April 2001.

==== Impact on Nuremberg legacy ====
Kononov's defence team, along with Russia's representative to the ECHR, Deputy Justice Minister Georgi Matyushkin, warned the ruling poses grave dangers to the legal legacy of the Nuremberg trials from World War II. Matyushkin stated "there are signs of attempts to revise the results of the Nuremberg processes." William Schabas, Latvia's counsel at the ECtHR trial, on the contrary, considers that the dissenting minority held Nuremberg judgment to be contrary to the Article 7 of the European Convention on Human Rights.

==== Skepticism ====
Kononov's former superior officer, later academician and Soviet functionary, Vilis Samsons, has questioned some of the First Latvian Partisan Battalion's wartime reports upon which the accusations against Kononov are based, alleging the description of the Mazie Bati operation was rife with factual errors and imprecisions.

== Death ==
Kononov died in Latvia on 31 March 2011 at the age of 88. In a telegram to Kononov's family, Russian President Dmitry Medvedev stated: "Vasily Kononov selflessly fought the Nazi invaders throughout the years of the Great Patriotic War. He remained loyal to the common bonds forged in battle and defended the truth about the events of those years throughout his entire life."

== Awards ==
In recognition of his wartime service, the Soviet Union awarded Kononov various honours, including:

- the Order of Lenin;
- the Order of the Patriotic War, first class;
- the Order of the Red Banner of Labour.

== See also ==
- Occupation of the Baltic states
- European Court of Human Rights cases on Occupation of Baltic States
