= Arturs Sproģis =

Soviet-Latvian partisan

Arturs Sproģis (6 March 1904 – 2 October 1980; Russian: Артур Карлович Спрогис) was a Latvian colonel and commander of the Soviet partisans during the occupation of Latvia by Nazi Germany in World War II.

== Early life and career ==
Sproģis was born in Riga in 1904 in to a working-class family. In 1919 he voluntarily joined the Latvian Red Riflemen at the age of 15 in defence of the short-lived Latvian Socialist Soviet Republic. At the same time he also joined the Komsomol. In 1920, he was sent to Komsomol courses in Moscow, after which he continued his military service in the Red Army fighting against the White forces of General Wrangel. Subsequently, he attended military academy, finishing in 1922. Thereafter he served in the border guards until 1928, when he was sent to the OGPU Border Guards School in Moscow for further training. Following these courses, he was assigned to the Special Section (Counterintelligence) of the Byelorussian SSR NKVD, where he served until 1936. He then was sent on a special mission in the Spanish Civil War. After returning from Spain in 1937, he began courses at the Red Army's M. V. Frunze Military Academy, completing his studies in 1941.

== Soviet partisan ==
With the start of Operation Barbarossa, Sproģis was involved in organising anti-German partisan resistance in Belarus and Latvia. From its formation in 1943 until 1944, Sproģis served as the Chief of Staff of the Latvian resistance movement.

== Later career ==
Later, he was appointed to the special group of activists from the Communist Party of Latvia, whose job it was to re-establish the functioning of the Latvian SSR after the Germans had been driven out of the country.

From 1944, he resided in Riga. After the complete liberation of the Latvian SSR from the Nazis and their allies, Sprogis was appointed head of the military department of the Central Committee of the Communist Party of Latvia.

Sproģis was awarded the Order of the Red Banner four times, as well as the Order of Lenin.

== Sources ==
- All details from Sproģis's CV in 1944, published in H. Strods (see below), v. 2, pp. 76–7.

== Literature ==
- Strods, Heinrihs (ed.), PSRS kaujinieki Latvijā, 2 vols (Riga, 2006–7); ISBN 9984-643-78-6 (v. 1), ISBN 9984-643-80-8 (v. 2) (in Latvian)
- Боярский, В.И., Диверсанты Западного фронта: Артур Спрогис и другие. Страницы Памят (Moscow: Красная звезда, 2007); ISBN 978-5-88727-035-7 (in Russian)

== See also ==
- Zoya Kosmodemyanskaya, famous Soviet female partisan who served under Sproģis in Special Unit 9903.
