= Riga Trial =

Nazi war crimes trial

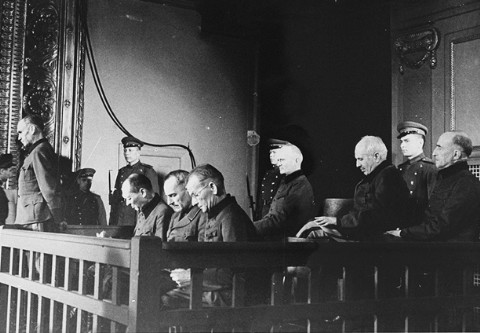
- Friedrich Jeckeln in the dock (standing, far left); Other defendants from left to right : 2. Generalmajor Hans Paul Kupper, 3. Generalleutnant Siegfried Ruff, 4. SA-Standartenführer Alexander Bocking, 5. Generalleutnant Wolfgang von Ditfurth, 6. Generalleutnant Albrecht Baron Digeon von Monteton, 7. Generalmajor Bronislav Pavel.
- Court: Soviet military tribunal Riga, Soviet Union
- Indictment: War crimes
- Decided: 3 February 1946

The Riga Trial was a war crimes trial held in front of a Soviet military tribunal between 26 January and 3 February 1946 in Riga, Latvian Soviet Socialist Republic, Soviet Union against six high ranking Wehrmacht officers, Höheren SS- und Polizeiführer Friedrich Jeckeln and SA-Standartenführer Alexander Boecking.

All eight defendants were found guilty of war crimes during the German–Soviet War of 1941–45 and sentenced to death. They were publicly hanged immediately after sentencing. Only Wolfgang von Ditfurth escaped execution due to bad health. He died in prison from heart failure on 22 March 1946.

== Proceedings ==
Unlike some previous trials, the prosecutors wanted to and were able to prove concretely that the main defendant, Jeckeln, was responsible for the crimes of which he was accused. Thus Jeckeln, a Nazi "race warrior" who oversaw the Rumbula massacre in Latvia, could be proven guilty on the basis of his own statements, as well as testimonies of other participants and survivors of the massacres as well as on the basis of German documents. Not only had he given the orders, but he was also present in person for some of the time, and had even participated personally in the shootings and boasted about it. Prosecutors were able to trace his "blood trail" through Ukraine and the Baltic states as a commander of Einsatzgruppen death squads and determine his responsibility for the murder of over 100,000 Jews, Romani, and others. Jeckeln defended his actions on the grounds that he was acting on orders from Reichsführer SS Heinrich Himmler.

Boecking, the area commissioner of the Tallinn district, was accused of the "Germanisation policy" in Estonia with the looting and extermination of Estonian people and the settlement of Germans in their place. Concrete accusations such as forced labour, forced relocation and looting were also made and concretely identified.

== Defendants ==
Name	Born	Rank	Functions
Friedrich Werther	1890	Generalmajor	1943/44 several Feldkommandanturen in the East; 1944 Commander of Riga's coastal defence
Bronislav Pavel	1890	Generalmajor	1942 Commander of 2 POW camps and later responsible for all POW camps in Reichskommissariat Ostland; 1943/1944 Oberfeldkommandant 392 (Minsk) and Korück in the 4th Army
Friedrich Jeckeln	1895	General der Waffen-SS	Higher SS and Police Leader in Southern Russia and Ostland; 1944 Commander V. SS-Gebirgskorps
Wolfgang von Ditfurth	1879	Generalleutnant	1939–1942 Commander 403rd Security Division; Military Commander of Kursk
Siegfried Ruff	1895	Generalleutnant	1942 Commander Division Nr. 401; 1944 Military Commander of Riga
Hans Küpper	1891	Generalmajor	1942–1944 Commander several Feldkommandanturen in Ukraine and the Baltics
Albrecht Digeon von Monteton	1887	Generalleutnant	1944 Commander 52nd Security Division; 1944 Commander of Libau
Alexander Boecking	1897	SA-Standartenführer	Bezirkskommissar Tallinn

== Sources ==
- Mike Schmeitzer: Konsequente Abrechnung? – NS-Eliten im Visier sowjetischer Gerichte 1945–1947. In: Todesurteile sowjetischer Militärtribunale gegen Deutsche (1944–1947): eine historisch-biographische Studie. Vandenhoeck & Ruprecht, 2015, ISBN 978-3-5253-6968-5, Page 63 and following.
