= Friedrich Jeckeln =

German SS general and war criminal (1895–1946)

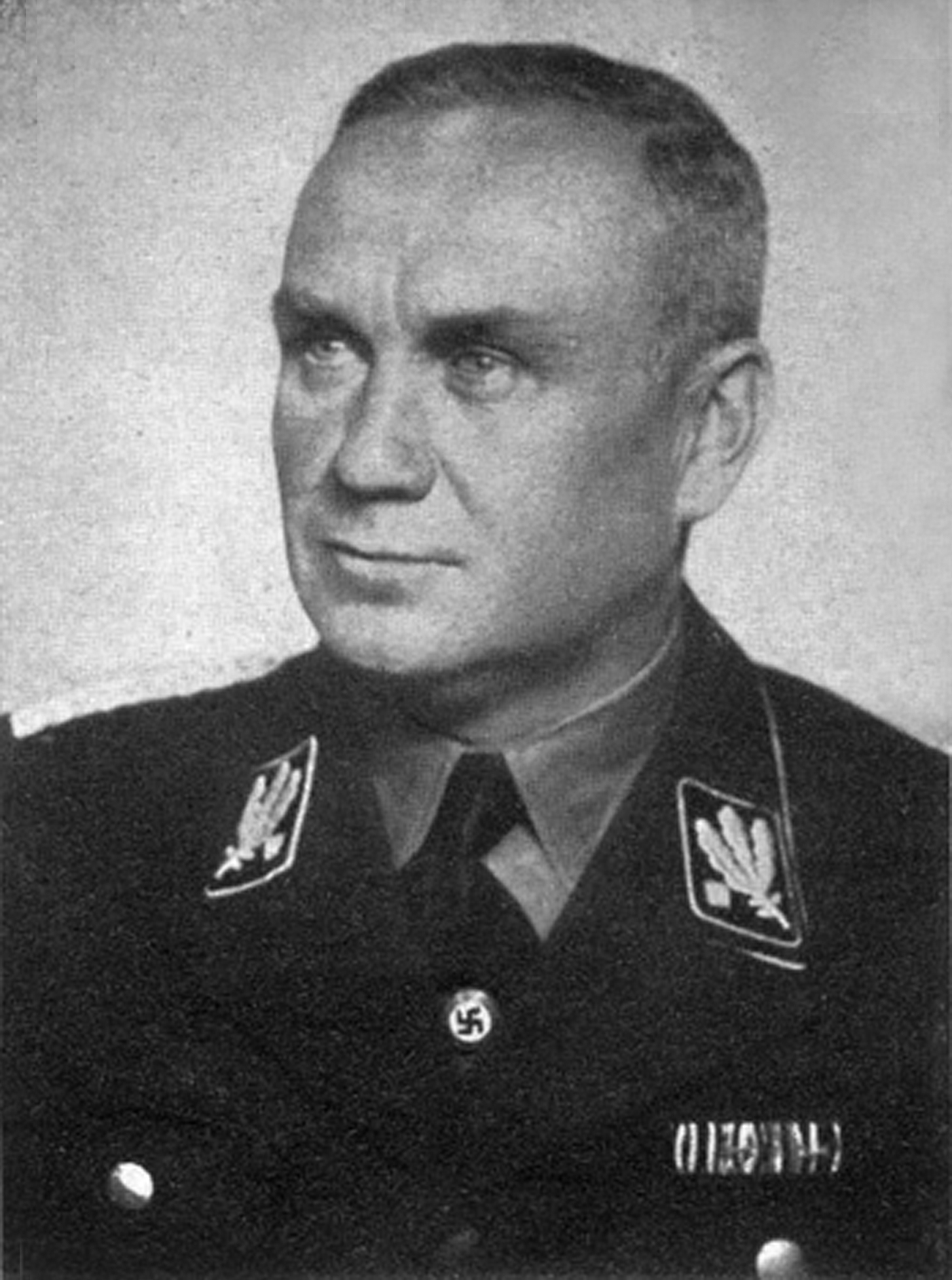
- Jeckeln in 1938
- Born: 2 February 1895; Hornberg, Grand Duchy of Baden, German Empire
- Died: 3 February 1946 (aged 51); Riga, Latvian SSR, Soviet Union
- Known for: Command of Einsatzgruppen death squads Kamianets-Podilskyi massacre Babi Yar massacre Rumbula massacre
- Status: Executed by hanging
- Conviction: War crimes
- Penalty: Death

Details
- Victims: 100,000+
- Span of crimes: 1941–1945
- Country: Estonia, Latvia, Lithuania and Ukraine
- Targets: Slavs, Jews, Roma and Communists
- SS career
- Allegiance: Nazi Germany
- Branch: Schutzstaffel
- Rank: SS-Obergruppenführer and General of Police and the Waffen-SS
- Commands: Higher SS and Police Leader (HSSPF): Wehrkreis XI; Wehrkreis VI; Southern Russia; Northern Russia; Upper Silesia; Commander, "Kampfgruppe Jeckeln"; Commander, V SS Mountain Corps
- Awards: Knight's Cross of the Iron Cross with Oak Leaves; German Cross, in gold War Merit Cross, 1st class with swords

Friedrich August Jeckeln (2 February 1895 – 3 February 1946) was a German Nazi Party member, police official and SS-Obergruppenführer during the Nazi era. He served as a Higher SS and Police Leader in Germany and in the occupied Soviet Union during World War II. Jeckeln was the commander of one of the largest groups of Einsatzgruppen death squads and was personally responsible for ordering and organising the deaths of over 100,000 Jews, Romani and others designated by the Nazis as "undesirables". After the end of the war in Europe, Jeckeln was convicted of war crimes by a Soviet military tribunal in Riga and executed by hanging.

== Early life ==
Jeckeln was born the son of a textile factory owner in Hornberg in the Black Forest area. He attended the local Volksschule and the Realschule in Freiburg im Breisgau. He studied engineering at the Friedrichs-Polytechnikum in Köthen for a year before enlisting in the Royal Prussian Army as a one-year volunteer with the 76th (5th Baden) Field Artillery Regiment at Freiburg im Breisgau in October 1913. After the outbreak of the First World War, he engaged in combat on the western front. Promoted to Leutnant of reserves in March 1915, he was transferred to the 40th Fusiliers Infantry Regiment in the same month and became regimental adjutant. He was seriously wounded in March 1916 and transferred to the Luftstreitkräfte where he trained as a pilot and served with Air Replacement Detachment 5 until the end of the war. He then briefly served in the Grenzschutz Ost, a Freikorps unit, and was discharged from military service on 20 January 1919, having earned the Iron Cross, 2nd class and the Wound Badge, in black.

Returning to civilian life Jeckeln, who had married in 1918, worked from 1919 to 1925 as an estate administrator near Danzig for his father-in-law Paul Hirsch, who was Jewish. He subsequently separated from his wife in 1926 and failed to provide support for her and their three children. His increasing antisemitism was attributed to the breakdown of the marriage and his disagreements with Hirsch. He then worked as a self-employed engineering technician in Braunschweig until 1929. From 1922 to 1924, he was a member of the nationalist and antisemitic Young German Order, and he also joined the conservative German National People's Party.

== SS career ==
Jeckeln joined the Nazi Party on 1 October 1929 (membership number 163,348) and was assigned full-time Party duties as a speaker and organiser. As an early Party member, he later would be awarded the Golden Party Badge. On 1 December 1930, he was accepted into the Schutzstaffel (SS) as member number 4,367. On 31 March 1931, he was given command of the 17th SS-Standarte in Harburg-Wilhelmsburg. On 22 June 1931, he was promoted to SS-Standartenführer and transferred to the command of the 12th SS-Standarte in Hanover. His next advancement came in September 1931, when he was promoted to SS-Oberführer and named the leader of SS-Abschnitt (district) IV in Braunschweig. In October, he participated in the large Sturmabteilung (SA) rally at Braunschweig for which he was awarded the Brunswick Rally Badge. In the end of January 1933, on the Nazi seizure of power, Jeckeln was put in charge of SS-Gruppe Süd in Munich and promoted to SS-Gruppenführer.

On 20 June 1933, Dietrich Klagges, the minister-president of the Free State of Brunswick, appointed Jeckeln as the police president of the state police office in Braunschweig and police consultant to the state ministry with the rank of Regierungsrat (government councilor). Jeckeln took command of SS-Gruppe Nordwest in Braunschweig on 10 August 1933 and, in October, was made commandant of the Schutzpolizei of Brunswick. In April 1934, he was also given command of the political police (Gestapo) in Brunswick. Jeckeln was promoted to SS-Obergruppenführer on 13 September 1936. On 28 June 1938, he was appointed the first Higher SS and Police Leader Mitte, headquartered in Braunschweig, but with jurisdiction over all of Wehrkreis (military district) XI. During the Kristallnacht pogrom of 9–10 November 1938, Jeckeln organised anti-Jewish actions in Braunsweig and Hanover.

Throughout his police career, Jeckeln was known for ruthlessness and brutality. Political opponents, especially members of the KPD, SPD and the unions, were relentlessly persecuted and some were killed. Together with Hilfspolizei (auxiliary police) chief Friedrich Alpers, Jeckeln was responsible for the Rieseberg Murders of 11 Communists and labor organisers on 4 July 1933. He also used his position in the police establishment to ensure that the murders never were properly investigated.

In addition to his SS and police duties, Jeckeln also pursued a political career. At the July 1932 parliamentary election, Jeckeln was elected as a deputy of the Reichstag from electoral constituency 16, South Hanover–Braunschweig. He was reelected to this seat in the two following elections and, in November 1933, he switched to constituency 15, East Hanover, which he represented until his capture in late April 1945. From March 1940 to April 1945, he also served as a Staatsrat (state councilor) in the government of the state of Brunswick.

== Holocaust perpetrator in the Soviet Union ==
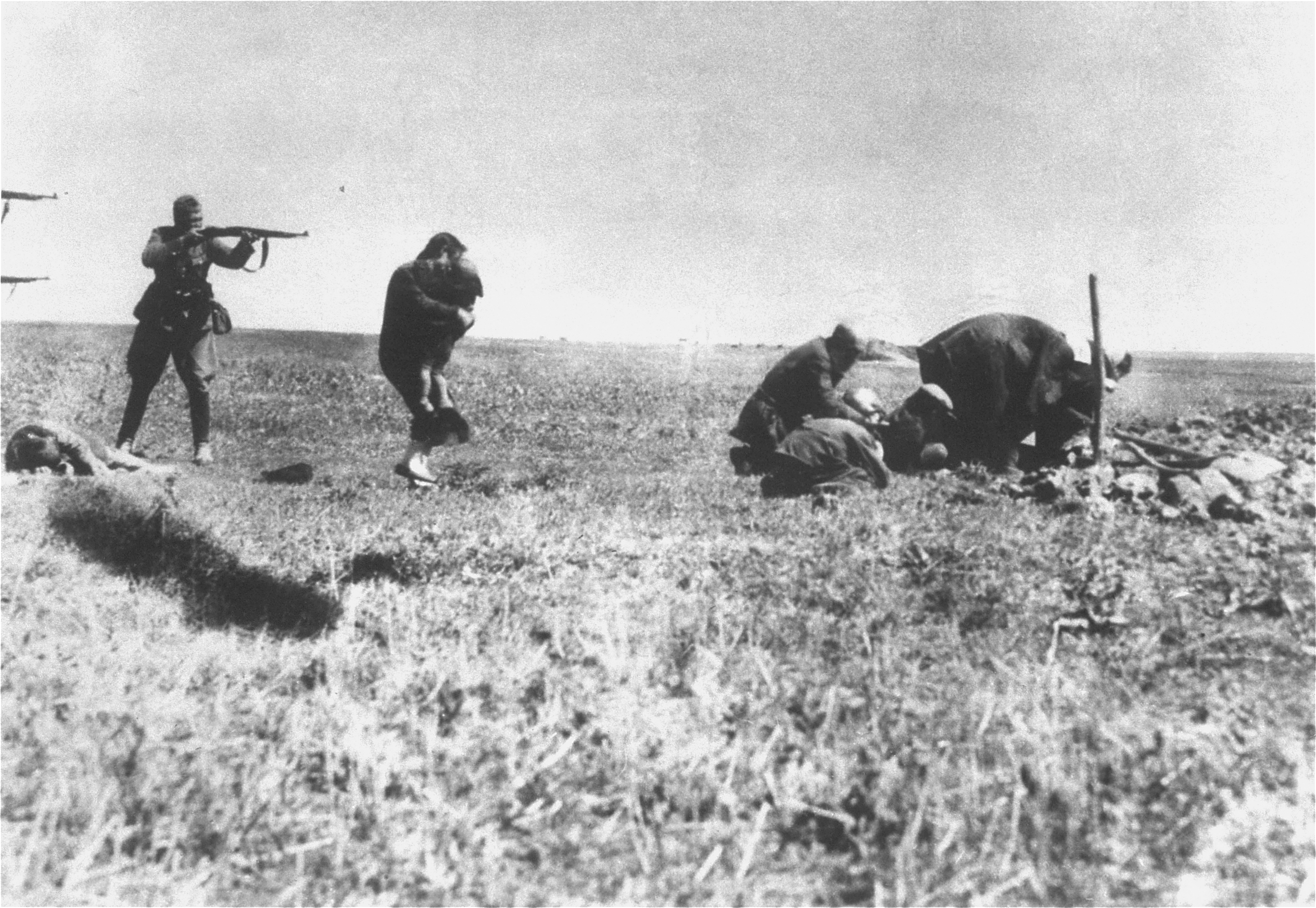
Murder of Jewish civilians in Ivanhorod, Ukraine, by Einsatzgruppen troops, 1942

After the Second World War began, Jeckeln was transferred to the Waffen-SS. As was the practice in the SS, Jeckeln took a lower rank from his Allgemeine-SS position and served as a battalion commander in Regiment 2 of the 3rd SS Panzer Division Totenkopf. He participated in the Battle of France between May and June 1940, and developed a friendship with the divisional commander, Theodor Eicke. On 9 July 1940, after completing his military deployment, he was transferred to Düsseldorf as the commander of Oberabschnitt West and the HSSPF West in Wehrkreis VI.

On 29 June 1941, just after the German invasion of the Soviet Union, he was selected by Reichsführer-SS Heinrich Himmler to serve as the Higher SS and Police Leader (HSSPF) of southern Russia and Ukraine. In this command, Jeckeln assumed control of all SS-Einsatzgruppen mass killings and anti-partisan security operations in his jurisdiction.

Jeckeln developed a method of killing large numbers of people, which he employed in the Kamianets-Podilskyi massacre (August 27–28, 1941; 23,600 killed) and the Babi Yar massacre (29–30 September 1941; 33,771 killed). This method (which became known as the "Jeckeln System") involved dividing staff into separate groups, each of which specialised in a separate part of the process:

1. The Security Service (SD) men rousted the people out of their houses.
2. The people to be murdered (typically Jews) were organised into columns of 500-1,000 people; and driven to the killing grounds about 10 kilometres to the south.
3. The Order Police (Orpo) led the columns to the killing grounds.
4. 3 pits where the killing would be done simultaneously had been dug in advance.
5. The victims were stripped of their clothing and valuables.
6. The victims were run through a double cordon of guards on the way to the killing pits.
7. The killers forced the victims to lie face down on the trench floor, or more often, on the bodies of the people who had just been shot.
8. In order to save on the cost of bullets, each person was shot once in the back of the head with a Russian submachine gun. The shooters either walked among the dead in the trench, killing them from a range of 2 metres, or stood at the lip of the excavation and shot the prone victims below them. Anyone not killed outright was simply buried alive when the pit was covered up.

This system was referred to by Jeckeln as "sardine packing" (Sardinenpackung) when he began personally commanding the killings of men, women and children in western Ukraine. It was reported that some of the experienced Einsatzgruppen killers were horrified by its cruelty. According to SS-Obersturmbannführer August Meier, in late July 1941 Jeckeln declared at Shepetivka: "Today, we'll stack them like sardines!". According to an official Reich Security Main Office report, by the end of August 1941, while directing the operations of Einsatzgruppe C and the 1st SS Infantry Brigade in western Ukraine, Jeckeln had personally supervised the murder of 44,125 men, women and children, "mainly Jews".

Meanwhile, Himmler had grown frustrated by the slower pace of killing in Latvia, where many of the Jews were being confined in the Riga Ghetto and used as forced labourers, and he decided to initiate a change in command. Effective 1 November 1941, Jeckeln swapped commands with SS-Obergruppenführer Hans-Adolf Prützmann to become HSSPF in the Reichskommissariat Ostland operating mainly in the Baltic States and northern Russia. After meeting with Himmler in Berlin, and receiving orders to complete the extermination of Riga's Jews, Jeckeln arrived in the city on 15 November 1941 and immediately began planning the logistics of his next mass killing. The site chosen was a pine forest in Rumbula. Determined to avoid any hesitancy on the part of those under his new command, he told a reluctant participant: "… if I catch somebody who objects to this [mass killing] or breaks down, then he will also be shot".

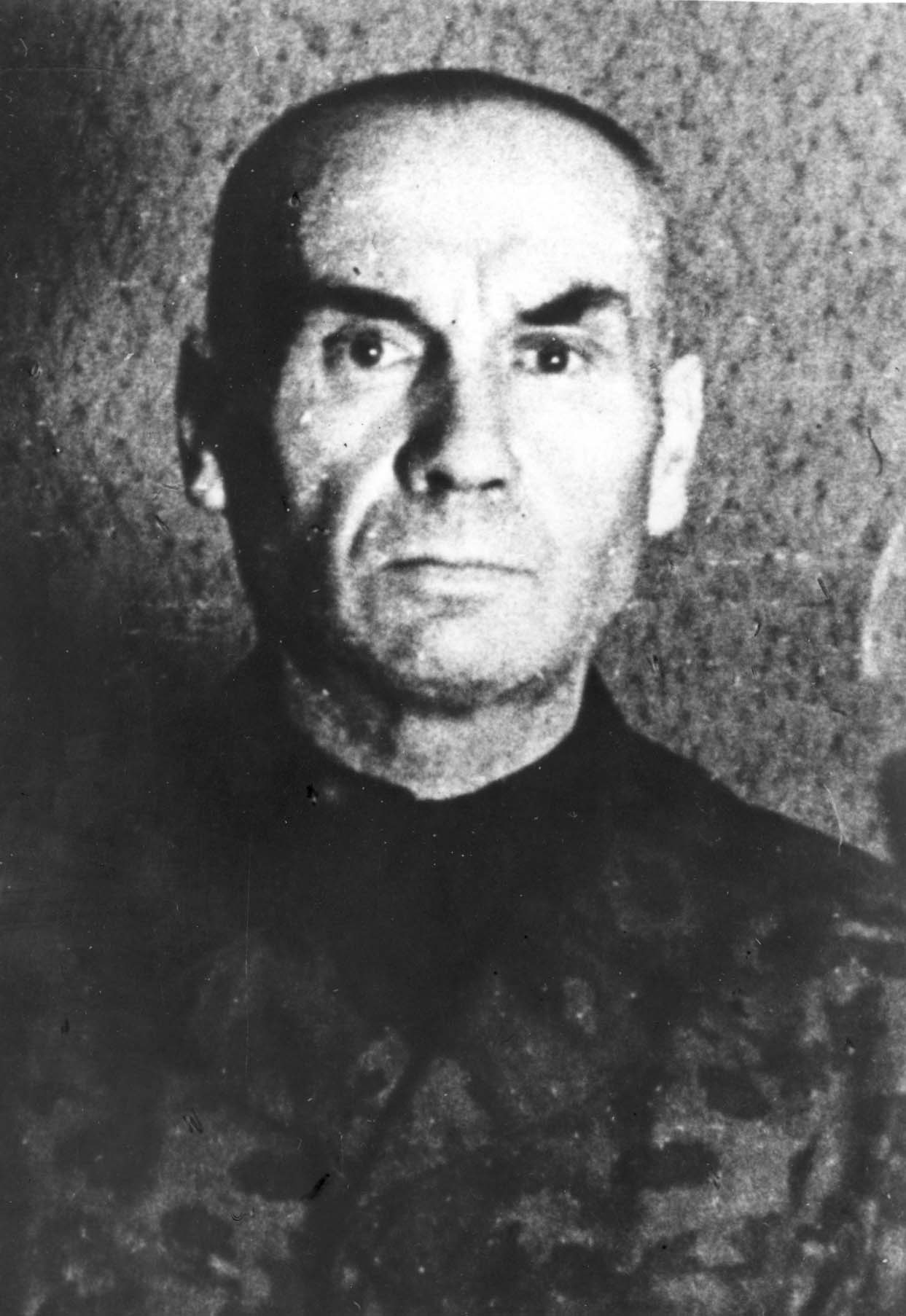
Jeckeln in Soviet custody

The mass killings at Rumbula took place on 30 November and 8 December 1941, and Jeckeln watched on both days as a total of 25,000 people were killed. Jeckeln proved to be an effective killer who cared nothing about murdering huge numbers of men, women, children and the elderly. One of only 3 survivors of the Rumbula massacre, Frida Michelson, escaped by pretending to be dead as the victims heaped shoes (later salvaged by Jeckeln's men) upon her:

A mountain of footwear was pressing down on me. My body was numb from cold and immobility. However, I was fully conscious now. The snow under me had melted from the heat of my body. … Quiet for a while. Then from the direction of the trench a child's cry: 'Mama! Mama! Mamaa!'. A few shots. Quiet. Killed.

— Frida Michelson, I Survived Rumbula (p. 93)

Himmler, apparently pleased with Jeckeln's actions, rewarded him with the appointment as commander of the SS-Oberabschnitt (main district) "Ostand" on 11 December, just days after the massacre. On 27 January 1942, Jeckeln was awarded the War Merit Cross 1st class with swords, for killing 25,000 at Rumbula "on orders from the highest level".

From February to August 1942, Jeckeln commanded the eponymous "Kampfgruppe Jeckeln", subordinated to the 18th Army command, at the front near Leningrad. He led two major anti-partisan operations in Belarus, Operation Swamp Fever (August–September 1942) and Operation Winter Magic (February–March 1943), in which entire regions were depopulated by burning villages and murdering or deporting their inhabitants. From October 1943 to January 1944, he led his Kampfgruppe in Latvia, subordinated to the 16th Army command. From January 1944 to January 1945, he was placed in charge of recruitment of new Waffen-SS formations from Latvian personnel. On 1 July 1944, Jeckeln was made a General der Waffen-SS and he was personally appointed by Adolf Hitler as the Defense Commissioner for the Baltic region, a post he retained until January 1945. In July and August 1944, he again commanded his Kampfgruppe in Latvia.

== Final commands and capture ==
From September 1944 to January 1945, Jeckeln held the post of HSSPF for Belgium and northern France but this was a "paper command", as the area had already been largely liberated following the Normandy campaign. In January 1945, having been pushed out of Latvia by the Red Army, Jeckeln was given a new command as the HSSPF for Upper Silesia and was also named as the inspector for replacement troops in southwest Germany. On 15 February, he was appointed to command the V SS Mountain Corps, the last command he was to hold. Fighting against the Red Army in the Battle of Halbe south of Berlin, his unit was encircled and Jeckeln was taken prisoner on 28 April 1945.

== Trial and execution ==
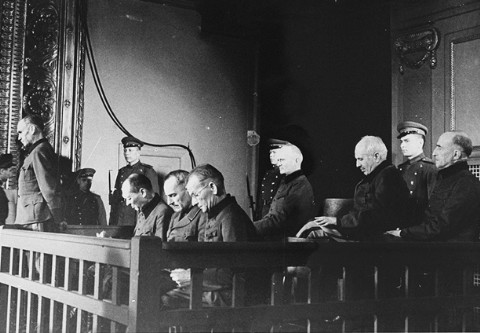
Jeckeln (left, standing), at the Riga Trial, 1946

Along with seven other high-ranking German officers, Jeckeln was tried before a Soviet military tribunal in the Riga Trial from 26 January to 3 February 1946. Jeckeln admitted his guilt and agreed to bear full responsibility for his actions and those of his subordinates in Reichskommissariat Ostland. Concluding his address to the tribunal, he said:

I have to take full responsibility for what happened in the borders of Ostland, within SS, SD and the Gestapo. This greatly increases my guilt. My fate is in the hands of the High Court, and so I ask only to pay attention to mitigating circumstances. I will accept a sentence in full repentance which I will consider as worthy punishment.

Jeckeln and the other defendants were found guilty and sentenced to death on 3 February 1946. Jeckeln was hanged in Riga that same day in front of some 4,000 spectators. Contrary to popular misconception, the execution did not happen in the territory of the former Riga Ghetto, but in Victory Square (Uzvaras laukums).

== SS and police ranks ==
SS and police ranks
Date	Rank
15 March 1931	SS-Sturmbannführer
22 June 1931	SS-Standartenführer
20 September 1931	SS-Oberführer
4 February 1933	SS-Gruppenführer
1 October 1933	Major der Polizei
1 November 1933	Oberstleutnant der Polizei
13 September 1936	SS-Obergruppenführer
1 April 1941	General der Polizei
1 July 1944	General der Waffen-SS

== Awards ==
- Clasp to the Iron Cross (1939) 2nd Class (October 1941) & 1st Class (12 May 1942)
- War Merit Cross 1st Class with Swords on 27 January 1942
- German Cross in Gold on 19 December 1943 as SS-Obergruppenführer and General der Polizei in Kampfgruppe Jeckeln
- Knight's Cross of the Iron Cross with Oak Leaves
  - Knight's Cross on 27 August 1944 as SS-Obergruppenführer und General der Waffen-SS, Höhere SS- und Polizeiführer Northern Russia, commander of Kampfgruppe Jeckeln in the 18th Army
  - Oak Leaves on 8 March 1945 as SS-Obergruppenführer und General der Waffen-SS and commanding general of the V SS-Mountain Corps
