= Riga Ghetto =

Nazi ghetto in occupied Latvia

Coordinates: 56°56′24″N 24°08′08″E

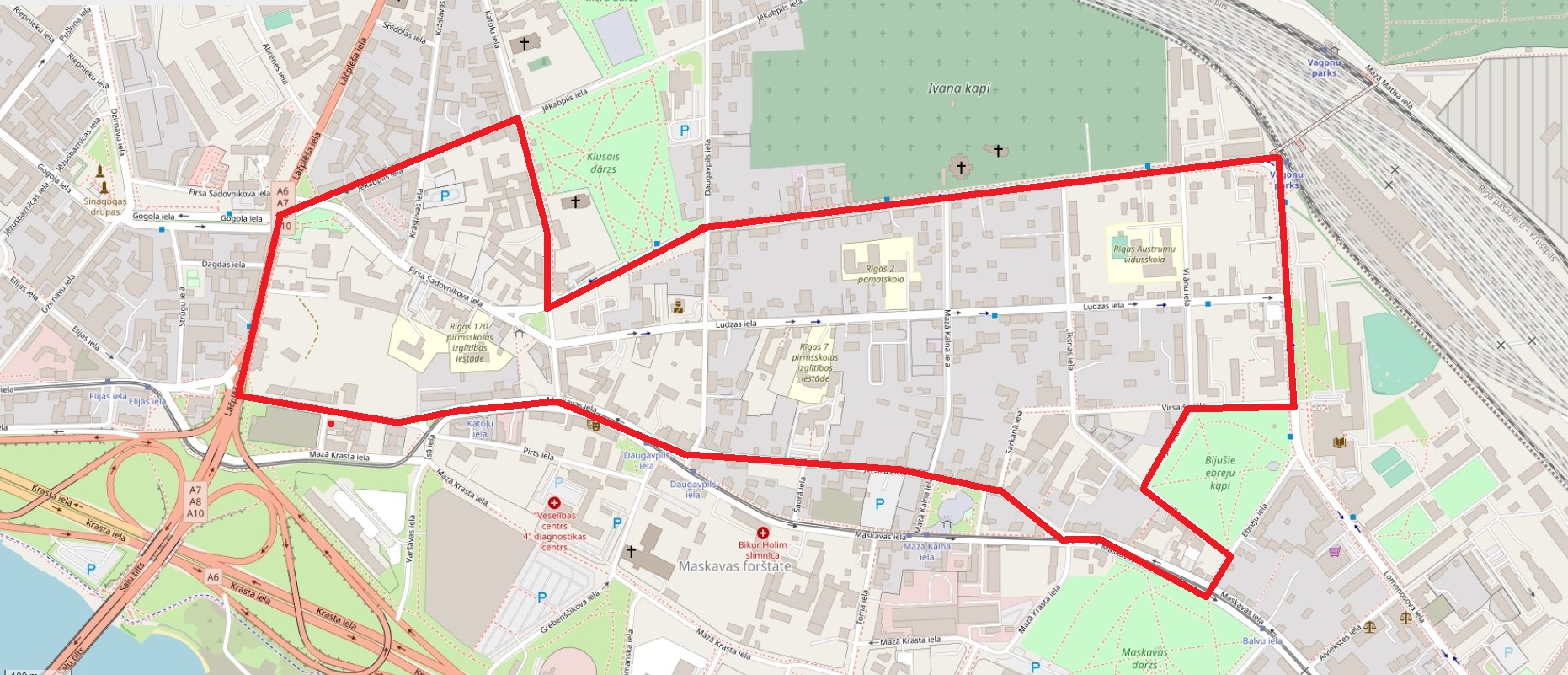
- Riga ghetto
- Also known as: Ghetto Riga, Maskavas Forštate, Moscow Forshtat
- Location: Riga, Latvia and vicinity, including Rumbula and Biķernieki forests
- Date: July 1941 to October 1943
- Incident type: Imprisonment, mass shootings, forced labour, starvation, exile, mass death from epidemics of neglected infectious diseases, forced abortions and sterilization
- Perpetrators: Hans-Adolf Prützmann, Franz Walter Stahlecker, Hinrich Lohse, Friedrich Jeckeln, Kurt Krause, Eduard Roschmann, Viktors Arājs, Herberts Cukurs
- Organizations: Nazi SS, Arajs Kommando, Latvian Auxiliary Police
- Camp: Kaiserwald
- Victims: About 30,000 Latvian Jews and 20,000 German, Czech, and Austrian Jews
- Survivors: About 1,000 people
- Memorials: At ruins of Great Choral Synagogue in Riga and in Rumbula and Biķernieki forests

Riga Ghetto was a small area in Maskavas Forštate, a neighbourhood of Riga, Latvia, where Nazis forced Jews from Latvia, and later from the German "Reich" (Germany, Austria, Bohemia, and Moravia), to live during World War II. On October 25, 1941, the Nazis evicted the ghetto's non-Jewish inhabitants and relocated all Jews from Riga and its vicinity there. Most Latvian Jews (about 35,000) were killed on November 30 or December 8, 1941, in the Rumbula massacre. The Nazis transported a large number of German Jews to the ghetto; most of them were later killed in massacres.

While Riga Ghetto is commonly referred to as a single entity, in fact there were several "ghettos". The first was the large Latvian ghetto. After the Rumbula massacre, the surviving Latvian Jews were concentrated in a smaller area within the original ghetto, which became known as the "small ghetto". The small ghetto was divided into men's and women's sections. The area of the ghetto not allocated to the small ghetto was then reallocated to the Jews being deported from Germany, and became known as the German ghetto.

== Restrictions on Jews ==
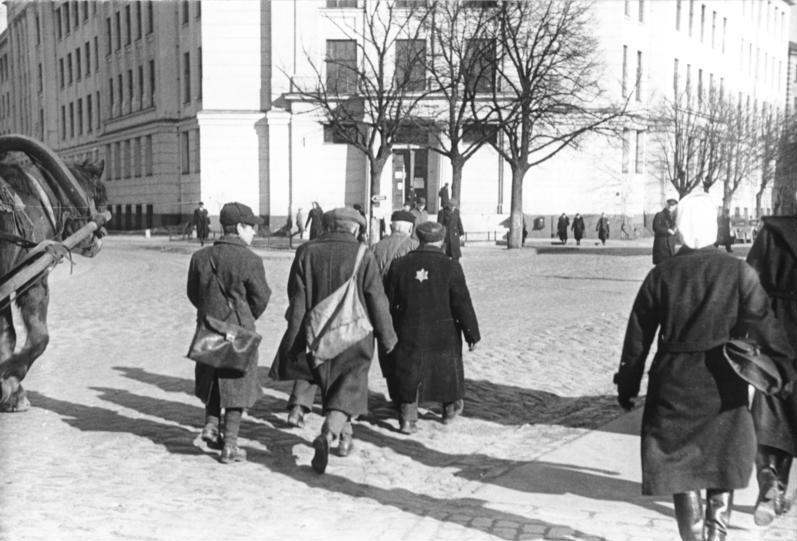
1942 photo showing Jews in Riga required to wear the yellow star and forbidden to use the sidewalk

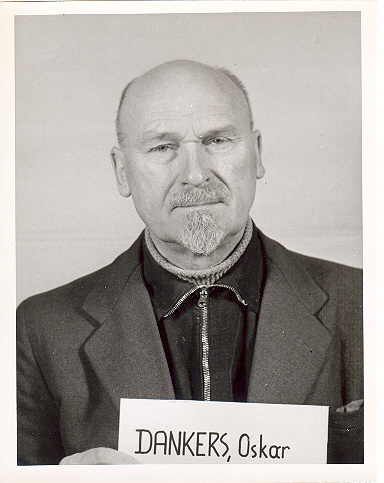
Oskars Dankers at the Nuremberg Trials

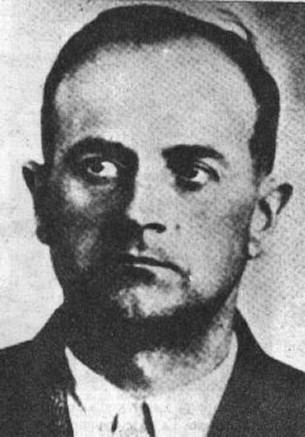
Edward Roschmann

At the beginning of July, the Nazi occupation organized the burning of the synagogues in Riga, and attempted, with varying degrees of success, to incite the Latvian population into taking murderous action against the Latvian Jewish population. At the end of July, the city administration switched from the German military to German civil administration. The head of the civil administration was a German named Heinz Nachtigall. Other Germans involved with the civil administration included Hinrich Lohse and Otto Drechsler. The Germans issued new decrees at this time to govern the Jews. Under "Regulation One", Jews were banned from public places, including city facilities, parks, and swimming pools. A second regulation required Jews to wear a yellow six-pointed star on their clothing, on pain of death. Jews were also allotted only one-half the food ration of non-Jews. By August, a German named Altmayer was in charge of Riga and the Nazis registered all the Jews there. Further decrees mandated that all Jews wear a second yellow star, this one in the middle of their backs, and that they not use sidewalks. The reason for the second star was to make Jews readily distinguishable in a crowd. Later, when Lithuanian Jews were transported to the ghetto, they were subject to the same two-star rule. Jews could be randomly assaulted with impunity by any non-Jew.

Officially the Gestapo took over the prisons in Riga on July 11, 1941. By this time, however, the Latvian gangs had killed a number of the Jewish inmates. The Gestapo initially set up its headquarters in the building of the former Latvian Ministry of Agriculture on Raiņa Boulevard. A special Jewish administration was set up. Gestapo torture and interrogation were carried out in the basement of this building. After this treatment the arrested persons were sent to prison, where the inmates were starved to death. Later the Gestapo relocated to the former museum at the corner of Kalpaka and Brīvības boulevards. The Nazis also set up a Latvia puppet government under Latvian General Oskars Dankers, who was himself half-German. A "Bureau of Jewish Affairs" was set up at the Latvian police prefecture. Nuremberg-style laws were introduced to force people in marriages between Jews and non-Jews to divorce. If the couple refused, the woman, if Jewish, was forced to undergo sterilization. Jewish physicians were forbidden to treat non-Jews, and non-Jewish physicians were forbidden to treat Jews.

== Construction of the ghetto ==
On July 21, Riga occupation authorities decided to concentrate Jewish workers in a ghetto. All Jews were registered and a Judenrat was set up. Prominent Riga Jews, including Eljaschow, Blumenthal, and Minsker, were chosen for the council. All of them had been involved with the Jewish Latvian Freedom Fighters Association and hopes were this would give them leverage in dealing with the occupation authorities. Council members were given large white armbands with a blue Star of David on them, which gave them the right to use the sidewalks and the street cars. On October 23, 1941, Nazi occupation authorities ordered all Jews to relocate to the Maskavas Forštate (Moscow Forshtat) suburb of Riga by October 25, 1941. About 30,000 Jews were concentrated into this small 16-block area The Nazis fenced them in with barbed wire. Anyone who went too close to the barbed wire was shot by Latvian guards stationed around the perimeter. German police (Wachtmeister) from Danzig commanded the guards. The guards engaged in random firing during the night.

When Jews relocated to the ghetto, Nazis stole their property. They were allowed to take very little into the ghetto, and what was left was handled by an occupation agency known as the Trusteeship Office (Treuhandverwaltung), which sent entire trainloads of goods back to Germany. The Germans overlooked the theft of large amounts of other, usually less valuable, property by Latvian police, seeing it as a form of compensation for the killings. Individual appropriations and self-interested appropriations by Germans were also common. Author Ezergailis believes that the SD was more interested in killing Jews than in stealing their property, whereas the reverse was true among the men of Lohse's "civilian" administration.

== Mass killings ==
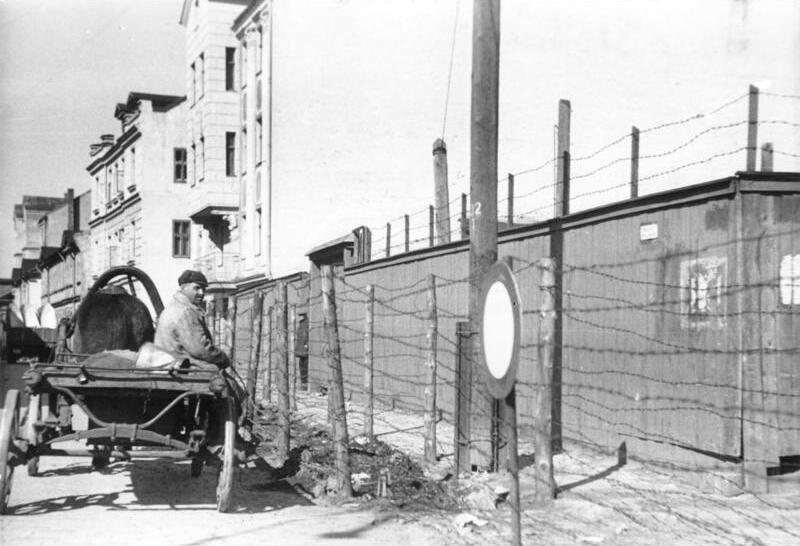
Riga ghetto in 1942

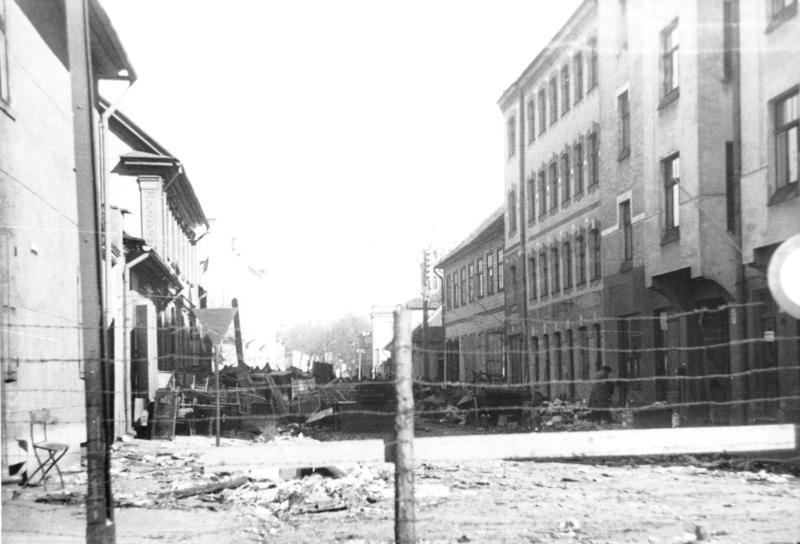
Riga ghetto in 1942

At the urging of Reinhard Heydrich and Joseph Goebbels, Adolf Hitler in September 1941 ordered the deportation of German Jews to the east. Since the originally planned destination, Minsk Ghetto, was already overcrowded, subsequent deportation trains were rerouted to Riga, which was itself overcrowded.

On November 30 and December 8 and 9, the Nazis shot about 27,500 Jews from the ghetto at pre-dug pits in the nearby forest of Rumbula. The large ghetto had been in existence for only 37 days. Only about 4,500 skilled male workers from the work squads, held in "the small ghetto", and about 500 women classified as seamstresses survived the Rumbula massacres.

The first transport of 1,053 Berlin Jews reached Šķirotava Railway Station in Riga on November 30, 1941. Everyone aboard was murdered the same day in Rumbula Forest. The next four transports, approximately 4,000 persons, were accommodated on the order of the commander of Einsatzgruppen A, Walter Stahlecker, at an empty yard, the so-called provisional concentration camp Jungfernhof.

A historical dispute about whether Latvian Jews were killed at Rumbula to make room for Reich Jews, has long caused bitter feelings between Latvian and German survivors. The evidence is not clear on this, but certainly deportations of Reich Jews followed closely in time after the Rumbula shootings.

== Small ghetto ==
After the mass killings at Rumbula, the survivors were formed into the small ghetto. Large posters were placed around Riga, stating "Anyone reporting to the authorities a suspicious person or a hidden Jew will receive a large sum of money and many other gratuities and privileges". Jews could sometimes be identified by whether they would eat pork. Internal passports were used to control the population, and were necessary, for example, to obtain a pharmacy prescription. The Nazi commandant of the small ghetto was named Stanke, and had also participated in the liquidation of the large ghetto. He was assisted by a Latvian named Dralle, who earned a reputation among Jews for brutality. Like in the large ghetto, the perimeter was guarded by Latvians. Within the ghetto, on Ludzas Street, the Nazis maintained a special company of guards, consisting of policemen from Danzig, commanded by Hesfer.

A work detail of Jews from the small ghetto was formed to gather up the property in the large ghetto of the Jews killed in the Rumbula shootings. The detail was headed by Aismann, a Jew from Daugavpils, who stood in favor with the Nazis and was distrusted by the other Jews. Many Jews tried to get back into the large ghetto to claim their property, including the valuables they had hidden. The guards were quick to execute any Jew from the small ghetto whom they found in the large one without authorization. Some of the effects from the large ghetto were redistributed to Latvians by occupation authorities. In other cases the German military authorities sent in trucks to load up furniture and other items. One general, Dr. Bamberg, picked out some items for himself and had them shipped back to Germany.

== Jews from Germany ==
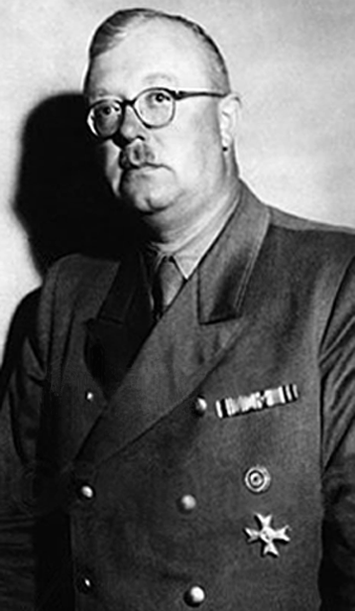
Hinrich Lohse

Following the first train on November 29, whose occupants were killed at Rumbula, Jews from Germany, Austria, Bohemia, and Moravia (the so-called "Reich Jews") began arriving in Riga on December 3, 1941. The Reich Jews were not immediately housed in the ghetto, but rather they were left at a provisional concentration camp established at Jumpravmuiza, also known as Jungfrauhof. Rudolf Lange supervised the arrival of the transports in Riga, aided by Obersturmbannführer Gerhard Maywald, whom Schneider describes as Lange's "sidekick". Lange personally shot a young man, Werner Koppel, who he felt was not opening a rail car door fast enough.

A local Nazi occupation official, Territorial Commissioner (Gebietskommissar) Otto Drechsler, who was a subordinate of Lohse, wrote a memo to Lange protesting at the relocation of Jews into the ghetto. Drechsler's real concern, however, was that Drechsler's men were still busy searching the buildings recently vacated by the murdered Latvian Jews for money, jewelry and furs. Consistent with this purpose, buildings were declared off-limits to the arriving Jews from Germany until they could be combed through by Drechsler's squads.

The first transport to go directly to the ghetto arrived on December 13, 1941, carrying Jews from Cologne. Their luggage had come with them on the train but it was all confiscated by the Gestapo using a ruse. Each piece of luggage had the owner's name on it. For men, the name "Isaac" had been added, and for women "Sarah". Schneider reports that a gas van was used in Riga to kill some of the arrivals from the last transport from Germany.

At least in the case of the December 11, 1941 transport from Düsseldorf, the train was composed of third-class passenger cars for the Jews and a second-class passenger car for the guards. Apparently efforts were made to keep the train heated. A rail car on another transport to Riga from Vienna was reported not to have been heated, which resulted in at least one person having frostbit feet, which later turned gangrenous and had to be amputated.

In cold weather the people were taken to the ghetto on the same day they arrived, without any property of any kind other than what they were wearing or carrying, under the guard of SS Death's Head troops. They were given no food of any kind, and had to live from whatever they could find in the vacated sector of the large ghetto to which they'd been assigned. In the next month, trains arrived from Vienna, Hanover, Bielefeld, Hamburg, Bavaria, Saxony, and from Theresienstadt concentration camp, Czech Jews who originally came from Prague. About 15,000 to 18,000 people arrived on the German transports. Some German women who arrived in the ghetto were not Jews but were married to Jewish men and had refused to leave them. In contrast to the Latvian Jews, the German Jews wore only one star, on their chests, and the word Jude (Jew) was written on the star.

1941–1942 Transports of Reich Jews
Origin	Depart date	Arrive date	Destination	Number	Comment
Berlin	27 Nov 1941	29 Nov 1941	Rumbula	1000	All transported except about 50 young men shot at Rumbula, 30 Nov 1941
Nürnberg	29 Nov 1941		Jungfernhof	714	
Stuttgart	1 Dec 1941		Jungfernhof	1,200	
Vienna	3 Dec 1941		Jungfernhof	1,042	
Hamburg	6 Dec 1941	9 Dec 1941	Jungfernhof and Stutthof	808	The transport, originally scheduled to depart on the 4th of December, 1941, did in fact depart on the 6th.
Cologne	7 Dec 1941		Ghetto	1,000	
Cassel	9 Dec 1941		Ghetto	991	
Düsseldorf	11 Dec 1941		Ghetto	1,007	
Bielefeld	12 Dec 1941		Ghetto	1,000	
Hanover	15 Dec 1941		Ghetto	1,001	
Theresienstadt	9 Jan 1942		Ghetto	1,000	
Vienna	11 Jan 1942		Ghetto and Jungfernhof	1,000	
Berlin	13 Jan 1942		Ghetto	1,037	
Theresienstadt	15 Jan 1942		Ghetto and Salaspils	1,000	
Berlin	19 Jan 1942		Ghetto	1,006	
Leipzig	21 Jan 1942		Ghetto	1,000	
Berlin	25 Jan 1942		Ghetto	1,051	
Vienna	26 Jan 1942		Ghetto	1,200	
Dortmund	27 Jan 42		Ghetto	1,000	
Vienna	6 Feb 1942		Ghetto and Rumbula forest	1,000	Notorious war criminal Alois Brunner was in command of this transport.

== Organization of the German ghetto ==
The German Jews organized themselves by their cities of origin. Each group had a representative on the Jewish Council. The head of the Jewish Council was a man from Cologne named Max Leiser. Unable to pronounce the Latvian street names, the German Jews renamed most of the streets in the German ghetto after the cities in Germany whence they had come. Unlike the Latvian Jews, the German Jews were directly under the authority of the Gestapo, which set up an office in the German ghetto on Ludzas street. A Jewish Ghetto Police force was also established. In general the Latvian and the German ghettos were subject to separate administration, although the occupation Labor Authority drew personnel from both ghettos.

== Krause becomes commandant ==
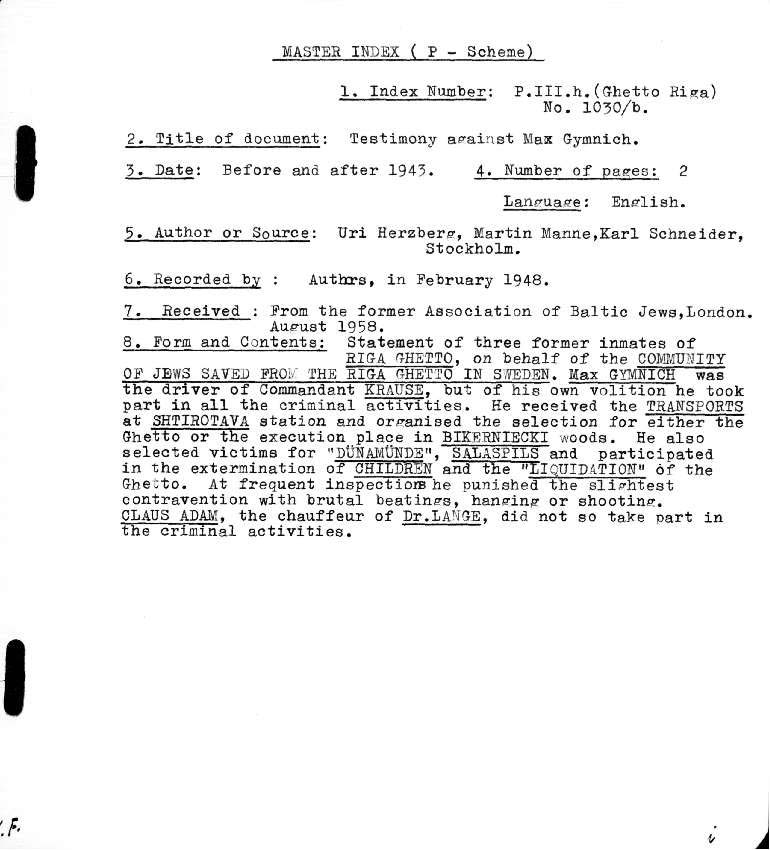
Testimony against Max Gymnich

In December 1941, Kurt Krause, whom Kauffman describes as a "man-eater", became the German commandant. Krause was a former Berlin police detective and his assistant Max Gymnich, was a Gestapo man from Cologne. (Note: Ghetto survivor Jeanette Wolff mistakenly identifies this commandant as Karl Wilhelm Krause, who was in fact Hitler's valet and is not known to have had any association with the Riga ghetto.)

Krause and Gymnich used a large and dangerous dog to help enforce their commands. A Latvian Jewish survivor Joseph Berman, is recorded as stating the following about described Gymnich:

He charges him with innumerable murders and being partly responsible for the inhuman treatment of the prisoners. * * * Gymnich personally selected the victims for deportation which meant certain death. Hence the name "Himmelsfahrtskommando – Ascension Commando." He knew that they would never reach their alleged destination of Dünamünde or the fish tinning factory at Bolderaa. Gymnich was the driver of Obersturmführer Krause and later of Untersturmführer Roschmann.

== Lithuanian Jews deported to ghetto ==
In February 1942 about 500 Lithuanian Jews were deported to the Latvian ghetto from the Kaunas Ghetto. They told the Latvian Jews of the mass killings that had taken place in the old forts around Kaunas (see Ninth Fort). There were many skilled craftsmen among the Lithuanian Jews, who gradually merged into the Lithuania Jewish population of the ghetto. Very few of them were to survive.

== Ghetto population changes ==
By December 22, 1941, there were about 4,000 German and 3,000 Latvian Jews housed in the entire ghetto. As of February 10, 1942, the approximate ghetto and concentration camp populations of German Jews in Riga and the vicinity were: Jungfrauhof: 2,500, German ghetto: 11,000, Salaspils: 1,300. Of the Latvian Jews, there were about 3,500 men and 300 women in the Latvian ghetto. Altogether 20,057 Jews from the Reich had been deported to Riga by February 10, 1942. Only 15,000 remained alive on that date. According to German ghetto survivor Schneider, the inhabitants of the German ghetto did not realize how many German Jews had been killed following deportation, and remained under the impression that deportation and forced labor were the worst that were going to happen:

Even from a historical perspective, the odds for the survivors did not seem too bad. As for the inmates of the German ghetto, they did not know that one-fourth of their number had already been exterminated. To them it was clear that they had been "resettled" as forced laborers, and they were able to live with that idea. Accordingly, they hoped that their strength would last until the war was over; they settled down in the ghetto and began to regard it as their home.

== Conditions in the ghetto ==
Access to and from the ghetto could only be made through the police yard. People exiting or entering the ghetto were searched here and often beaten.

=== Internal government ===
Both the Latvian and German ghettos had an internal Jewish government. All communications from the "Aryan" society with Jews were to go through the Jewish Council (Judenrat). Frida Michelson wrote much later that while some members of the Jewish Council tried to improve things for the Jews, in her opinion, "the Judenrat was a fiction, created to help the Nazis organize the annihilation of the Jewish population". Gertrude Schneider said of the German Judenrat that it employed a number people, worked efficiently, but "was sometimes used for sinister purposes, mainly in the beginning when the German authorities decided that the ghetto was becoming too crowded, with many people drawing food rations but not producing enough".

=== Food ===
Legally, food could only be purchased from shops within the ghetto, and only with ration books. What food was available was of poor quality. These books were printed with yellow covers which were imprinted with Jude and Zhid ("Jew" in German and Yiddish). The council made the decision to allocate ration cards according to how much work a person was performing for the occupation authorities. There was a black market in food. People working outside the ghetto tried to get food and bring it into the ghetto, but it was extremely difficult to get it past the police checkpoint at the ghetto entrance. Once the ghetto was sealed, the ghetto guards searched the returning work crews and anyone trying to smuggle in food was beaten, sometimes to death, or shot.

In 1942, the official rations in the German ghetto were 220 grams of bread per day, one portion of fish gone somewhat bad per week, and occasional servings of turnips, cabbage or frozen potatoes. Once in a while there would be horse meat. Most of the small children had been killed in the Dünamünde Action in March 1942. Those who survived received one liter of fat-free milk per week.

=== Finances and property ===
The Nazis, under an October 13, 1941 edict issued by Lohse, entitled "Directions concerning treatment of Jewish property" officially decreed the forfeiture of almost every item of value possessed by the Jews. As a result, the Jews concealed as much property and valuables as they could in hiding places within the ghetto.

=== Housing ===
The housing problem in the ghetto was severe. Many houses had no electricity, plumbing, gas, or central heating. Only a few thousand people had lived in the Moscow suburb before it was designated as the ghetto, and now with the overcrowding, each person was allotted only 6, later reduced to 4, square meters of private living space. There was contention for living space among the Jews. High-ranking occupation officials pressured the Jewish council to give the best apartments for the Jews who were working for them. The Jewish council appointed inspectors to address the housing issue. Minsker on the Jewish council put an end to this by forbidding Jews to enter the council building with a non-Jew. A special residence on Ludzas Street was established for older people.

=== Employment ===
The Nazis had set up a Labor Authority staffed by representatives of the German military command, including two people named Stanke and Drall. The Jewish committee had a liaison man with the Labor Authority, a Jew from the town of Rujene named Goldberg. Every morning the work crews would assemble in the streets according to their work assignments. There was no pay or food given for work. Work sites included the Field Headquarters, the Billeting Department, the Gestapo, HVL, the Ritterhaus, the Army Vehicle Park (HKP) and others. Other people worked within the ghetto, for example, at a ghetto laundry, or built barracks at Jungfrauhof. The Labor Authority issued a limited quantity of yellow-colored work permits to specialists. Highly skilled craftsmen received special certificates with the legend WJ for "valuable Jew" (wertvoller Jude). Work was not always a protection from attack. About thirty young women and two young men were detailed to work in the Olaine forest near Riga, and at the end of the work day they were murdered by their Latvian guards. On another occasion, the highranking Nazi SS leader Friedrich Jeckeln ordered shot three Jewish women who worked at the Ritterhaus. Their smoking of cigarettes had offended him.

=== Schools in the ghetto ===
Krause allowed the German Jews to set up schools for the children aged 5 to 14 years. The larger groups of deportees established schools for their children. There were a large number of male teachers available, but because it appeared that the only way for the people of the ghetto to survive was to marshal the greatest number of men for work for the Germans outside the ghetto, the teaching duties were assigned to women. For example, the head of the Vienna school was known as "Aunt Mary" (Tante Mary) Korwill. While Korwill was a trained teacher, many of the other women teachers were not. Among the deportees from Vienna was Professor Alfred Lemberger, who had taught at an academic high school, who supervised the lesson plans for Tante Korwill. The Berlin school was also supervised by an elderly former academic high school teacher. School supplies, such as paper, were short, and as a result training was done mainly by rote, with the older children helping the younger ones.

Special efforts, including smuggling and bribery of the Latvian guards, were made to make sure that food, which was allocated by the Germans according to work outside the ghetto, could be obtained for the teachers. The separate schools were consolidated after the murder of large number of parents and smaller children in the Dünamünde Action, and despite this shock, Professor Lemberger continued to develop separate lesson plans for each pupil. Other academics continued to give lessons privately. Their payment was food. For example, Professor Schwartz gave instructions in mathematics to older students so that, should they be released from the ghetto, they would not have fallen behind their peers.

Knowledge of a trade was especially valuable to help ensure survival, as skilled tradesmen could earn extra food. Some of the Latvian Jews, among whom there were a greater number of skilled craftsmen, helped teach their trades to the German Jews. Carpentry lessons were given to four older boys by Felix, a Berliner who had owned a furniture store. Once the children turned 14, they were sent out in labor details. Possession of craft skills, such as plumber, painter, electrician, roofer, mechanic or welder could save their lives. Women had more difficulty acquiring a craft, most of which were reserved by tradition for men, but many were trained as seamstresses.

=== Culture and recreation ===
The occupants of the German ghetto made an effort to perform musical works and plays. There were many talented people among them. The Nazi commandant, Krause, and his staff, often attended and enthusiastically applauded the performances. The concerts and the more formal plays were given in the same factory-like structure which was used for sorting the effects of the victims of the various massacres and "actions" that took place in Riga and the rest of Latvia. For these events, Krause and other Nazis sat in the front row. Krause assisted the orchestra, by providing instruments, such as a cello (whose original owner had been murdered or worked to death at Salaspils), from the confiscated baggage from the transports.

During the summer of 1942, singing events were held out of doors in the vacant lots behind the houses. Krause, Gymnich, and Neumann attended a few of these, but stood off a bit, not sitting on the ground like the Jews but leaning up against a tree or a building smoking cigarettes.

Dances were also put on for young people. Popular music was provided with the help of Ludwig Pick, a Jew from Prague, stole a phonograph from one of the German occupation facilities in the city, dismantled it and brought it bit by bit through the check point and into the ghetto, where he put it back together. Teenage workers stole phonograph records from places of employment, which they played at the dances on the phonograph.

=== Ghetto police ===
Both the German and the Latvian Jewish councils establish ghetto police forces. Michael Rosenthal, a Riga jeweler, was appointed the Latvian chief, and he recruited some of the younger men to act as policemen. They wore uniforms and blue caps which bore the Star of David. Kaufmann, a survivor of the Latvian ghetto, praised the actions of the ghetto police: "all of them risked their lives during these difficult times in order to help us." Most of the Latvian ghetto police were members of Betar, a Zionist organization founded in Riga in the 1920s.

Each German group had their own police force and the size depended on the number of the deportees from the particular vicinity in Germany. The overall titular head of the German ghetto police force was Friedrich Frankenburg, but the actual person in charge was Max Haar, of Cologne.

=== Medical care and sanitation ===
At the outset of the Latvian ghetto, there was only a single out-patient clinic available for medical care, although because the ghetto was only in existence for a short time, medical supplies were more than sufficient. The people were also under extreme psychological pressure and there were suicides. Latvian ghetto survivor Kaufmann praised the efforts of the physicians:

... the physician Dr. Josef tried with all his might to alleviate our sufferings. During the ghetto's short lifespan our doctors performed virtually superhuman feats. Because there was no room in the clinic for all the patients, they treated other patients at home, voluntarily and free of charge. One could see Dr. Mintz and Dr. Kostia Feiertag going to visit their patients day and night. And the other doctors were no less committed.

The Jewish council established a Technical Authority, which attempted to set up a public bath. The Riga city government refused to pick up refuse from the ghetto. The occupants had to dig huge garbage pits in courtyards, but this was an inadequate measure. Survivor Kaufmann estimated that if the ghetto had lasted much longer the sanitary problems would have likely resulted in an epidemic.

After the surviving Latvian Jews were moved into the small ghetto, the German Jews took over the clinic in the large ghetto. This was staffed by Latvian physicians who treated Germans also.

Some buildings in the ghetto had interior plumbing, however this failed during cold weather. In the German ghetto this meant that water would have to be hauled from the well on Tin Square, which was right underneath the gallows. Cesspools had to be cleaned out, this was originally assigned as a punishment in the German ghetto by the Judenrat, however later it became a necessary task done by everyone. The sewage was used as fertilizer, and the smell was terrible.

== Forced abortions and sterilization ==
Children were not supposed to be born in the ghetto. After the Rumbula massacres, very few women survived in the Latvian ghetto, and they were housed separately from the men. In the German ghetto, there was no segregation of the sexes. Even so, the Germans forbade sexual relations. This proved impossible to enforce. However, the consequences were that abortions were the most common sort of medical operation performed by the Jewish doctors. A few children were born alive in the ghetto in the first year; they were killed by an injection of poison. Krause, the German commandant, hated the idea of young Jewish women becoming pregnant, and often watched abortions at the clinic. He would threaten to have both the father and the mother sterilized. For a woman to have a second abortion meant mandatory sterilization, consequently the Jewish doctors attempted to perform such abortions in secret.

== Forced labor ==
During the early days of the occupation, Latvian Jews came to rely on work permits (German: Ausweis) issued by the German occupation authorities as protection against daily brutalities by Latvians. Some Germans were protective and even kind towards the Jews who were working for them. Another survivor, Frida Michelson, sent to work on sugar beet fields near Jelgava for six weeks in the summer of 1941, told her fellow forced laborers:

This work is our salvation. As long as we can keep on working we'll stay alive. I am all for staying alive.

On the other hand, the occupation authorities, including both the Gestapo and the Wehrmacht confiscated both housing and furniture at will from Jews. Anyone standing in the way was simply murdered. A Jewish work detail was formed to remove belongings from Jewish homes and shops.

The first tasks assigned to the German Jews were to shovel snow, clean up the apartments of the Latvian Jews who had been "evacuated", or unload cargo in the harbor. Later, the German and the Latvian Jews were formed into combined work details. Commandant Krause appointed Herbert Schultz as "Work Detail Administrator", and he dealt with the German and Latvians outside the ghetto. Skilled craftsmen worked for the German war effort in various positions. They had a better chance to survive hence these positions were highly sought after. Many of the German Jews had been professionals or merchants, and lacked the ability to perform a craft, and without this, their rate of survival would be greatly reduced.

At the end of 1942 approximately 12,000 Jews of the Riga ghetto were in work assignments. Of these, about 2,000 were housed outside the ghetto at their workplaces, 2,000 worked in workshops within the ghetto, and more than 7,300 were led from the ghetto in columns to their workplaces. An account from the year 1943 lists 13.200 Jews in the ghetto.

There were many instances of work-related killings during the history of the Riga ghetto.

- Shortly after the German Jews arrived, the guard Danskop accused 18 young German women of stealing during the course of the work they were doing cleaning of the apartments of the murdered Latvian Jews, and had them shot.

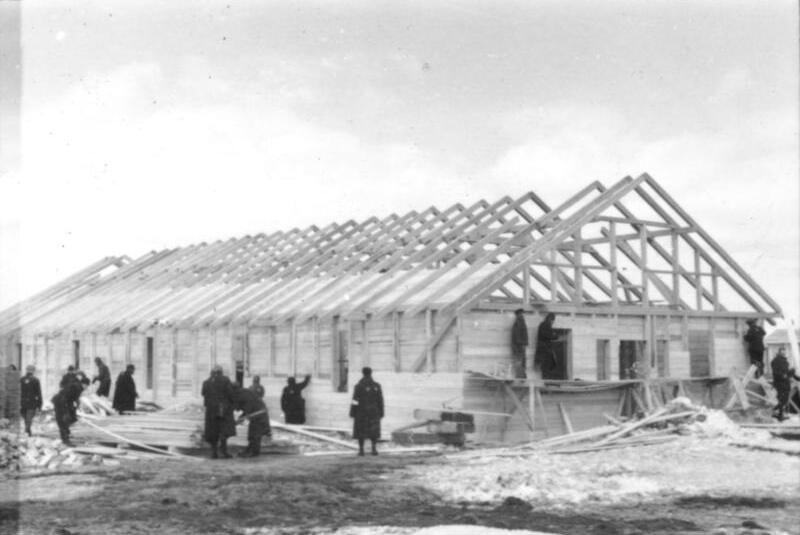
December 22, 1941: Forced labor used to construct Salaspils concentration camp.

- In January 1942, the Nazi authorities picked 900 of the youngest and strongest Jews and sent them southeast to a town 18 km from Riga to build a concentration camp, which became known as the Salaspils concentration camp. There these Jews were worked to death, so that in June 1942, only 60 to 70 "living skeletons" returned to Riga. In addition to the many who died during the course of the camp construction, Rudolf Lange and the Schutzstaffel Nazi SS man Richard Nickel executed a number of people for even the slightest infraction.

== The Dünamünde Action ==
In March, 1942, the Nazi authorities in Riga decided the German ghetto was getting too crowded, and organized two massacres of the German Jews. These massacres became known as the "Dünamünde Action" in which they killed about 3,800 people, mostly children, the elderly and the sick, using a ruse to trick the victims into believing they would be going to an easier work assignment. Instead they were all shot.

== Executions in the ghetto ==
The Nazi authorities established a prison in the German ghetto, and both German and Latvian Jews were subject to being incarcerated on even a suspicion of infraction of the many ghetto rules. Many were never seen again after being taken to the ghetto prison. Among other things, bartering, and smuggling forbidden items, such as food, into the ghetto, which were necessary for survival, were punishable by death if one were apprehended. It was also punishable by death to possess a newspaper or other written material. Hangings were frequent in the ghetto, almost a daily occurrence. Generally men were hanged, while women were taken to the cemetery and shot by Commandant Krause. Krause in particular seemed to enjoy shooting women himself; for example, about 10 days after the Dünamünde operation he shot the teacher Mary Korwill, who had made the mistake of wearing her own gold watch, a "crime" in the ghetto. Krause was somewhat erratic in that he did not always execute an offender. Male violators could expect no mercy from Krause; they were always hanged, although in one case, of Johann Weiss, a lawyer and an Austrian veteran of World War I, he allowed a "commutation" to shooting.

German ghetto survivor Ruth Foster's father was working outside the Riga Ghetto sawing wood for the SS. A German soldier from their home town passed him, and said "Wilhelm, what are you doing here?" The father only answered "Bring me some bread." The soldier did so, but it did not help the father. As the Jews were marched back into the ghetto that evening from their work assignments, they were searched, and those that were found with food, even potato peelings, were arrested. Later, the Nazis forced all the Jews of the ghetto to assemble, and he shot the father and two others in the back of the head with his pistol, as the family watched along with the other Jews of the ghetto.

== 1942 in the German Ghetto ==
On April 2 and May 4, 1942, two transports of Jewish men were taken from the ghetto to Salaspils concentration camp. Krause had wanted the men retained in the ghetto, while Lange wanted them transferred to Salaspils for work duties. Conditions at Salaspils were harsh. In August, 1942 about one third of the transportees to Salapils were returned to the ghetto. Many of those returned were in poor health and died shortly after their return.

The German Jews in the ghetto began to rumor among themselves that the Germans had brought them to Riga to be exterminated. Outside of the ghetto there were housed a few Jews whose work duties gave them confirmation of the overall Nazi plan. Some Jews worked at the headquarters of Einsatzkommando 2c were given the task of sorting the clothing and jewelry that had come from the victims of the massacres in Latvia. Many of these came in suitcases, and from the names and addresses on the luggage, the Jews charged with sorting the items could tell where they'd come from. Other personal effects from the victims came into Riga from all over Latvia where murders were occurring. The local SS picked over the effects before they were sent back to Germany, and Jewish women who cleaned the apartments of officers found many valuable things, such drawers full of watches, closets full of furs (with the labels of their original owners still on them).

The Nazi gave the task of digging graves to a work detail called "Kommando Krause 2." This group of 38 Jewish men, was housed at the Central Prison. They were instructed not to tell anyone about the mass killings. 16 of these men survived long enough to be returned to the German ghetto, violated their instructions, and told the people there about the mass killings that had been perpetrated in the forests around Riga.

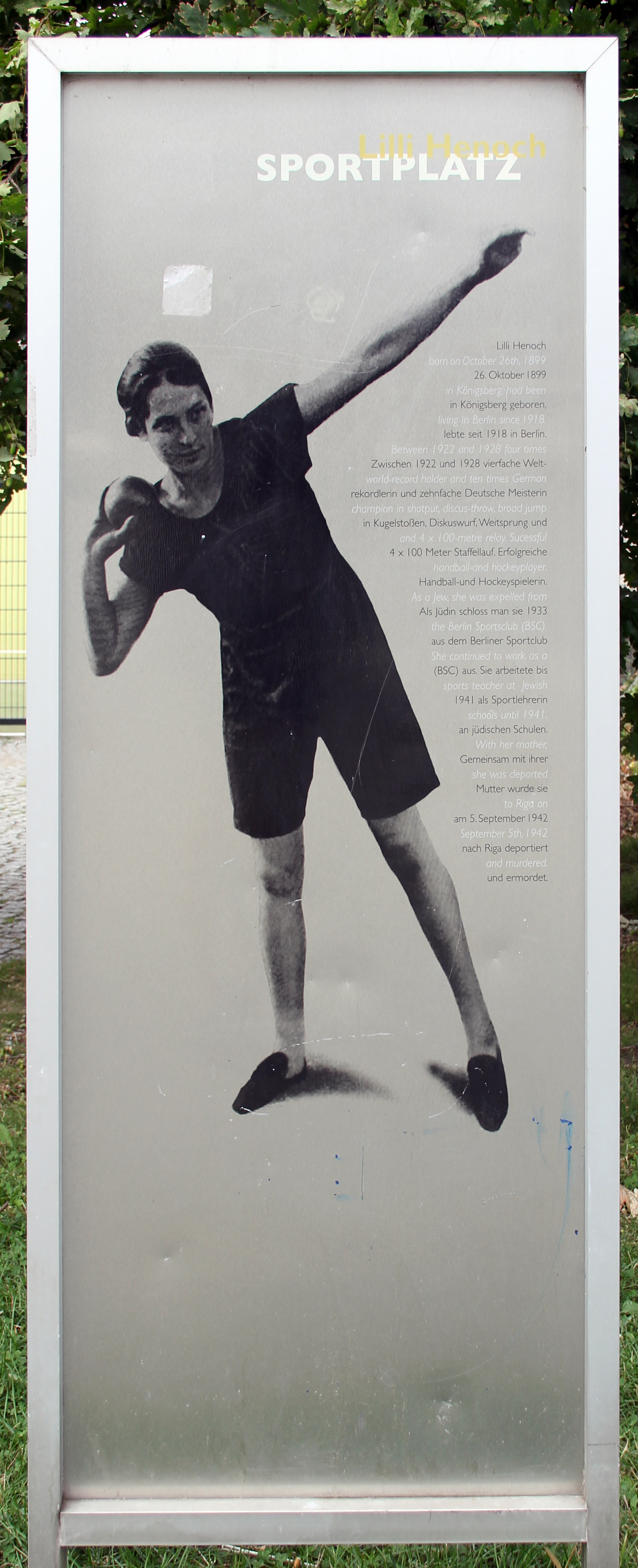
Lilli Henoch memorial, Askanischer Platz 6, in Berlin-Kreuzberg.

Lilli Henoch, a German world record holder in the discus, shot put, and 4 × 100 meters relay events, and the holder of 10 German national championships, was deported to the ghetto on September 5, 1942, and killed by machine gun and buried in a mass grave shortly thereafter.

== Dissolution and KZ Kaiserwald ==
The lack of workers for important war enterprises, and the economic advantage which the WVHA drew by the hiring from Jewish forced laborers, did not, however, protect permanently against the destruction intentions of the Nazis. Heinrich Himmler arranged in June 1943 on to seize:

... all Jews existing in the area east country still in ghettos into concentration camps together… 2) I forbid starting from 8/1/1943 each bringing out Jews from the concentration camps to work. 3) in close proximity to Riga a concentration camp is to be established to move into that the whole clothing and equipment manufacturing, which the armed forces has today outside, is. All private companies are to be switched off. […] 5) the unnecessary members of the Jewish ghettos are to be evacuated to the east.

In the summer of 1943, in the Riga suburb of Kaiserwald (Latvian: Mežaparks) the Nazis constructed Kaiserwald concentration camp, where eight barracks for prisoners were planned. The first 400 Jews were transferred there in July 1943 from the ghetto. For them, this meant separation from family. They were confronted also with prisoner clothing, shearing of their hair, and loss of privacy.

From this time on the gradual dissolution of the ghetto in Riga began. For the most part it was vacated in November 1943. Extensive plans to remove and second establish the concentration camp were scrapped. Several enterprises furnished camps, in which the forced laborers were housed. Older people, children, people who cared for the surviving children, and persons with illnesses were transferred by train in November 1943 to Auschwitz concentration camp. The total on this transport is in dispute, but most observers believe that 2,000 people were included on the Auschwitz train. By the end of November all the Jews who were not murdered in Biķernieki or elsewhere had been transferred out of the ghetto.

== Riga Ghetto's List ==
Riga Ghetto's List (Jewish ghetto in Riga, 1941–1943.). Tamara Zitcere (02.12.1947. – 25.07.2014.) has overlooked and studied 346 books of House registers at Latvian State Historical Archive, including more than 68 house registers of Riga ghetto preserved by nowadays. Total number of houses in Riga Ghetto was 81. Upon the research of information and the generalization of data, the list of more than 5764 Jewish victims of the ghetto was prepared. The Riga Ghetto's List (1941—1943.), List of Riga ghetto imprisoners by Tamara Zitcere based on house registers of Riga ghetto is exhibited at the Riga Ghetto and Latvian Holocaust Museum in Riga, Latvia and Yad Vashem, Jerusalem, Israel.

== Time line ==
- 22 June 1941: German invasion.
- 1 July 1941: Riga falls to German forces.
- 13 Oct 1941: German occupation civil chief Hinrich Lohse issues forfeiture decree.
- 24 Oct 1941: Ghetto completely enclosed by barbed wire.
- 25 Oct 1941: All Latvian Jews in Riga and vicinity required to live in the ghetto.
- 29 Nov 1941: The first trainload of about 1,000 German Jews arrives in Riga.
- 30 Nov 1941: First day of Rumbula massacre; approximately 12,000 Latvian Jews from the ghetto murdered; 1,000 German Jews from the first train also murdered.
- 1 Dec to 8 Dec 1941: Four trainloads of Jews deported from the Reich arrive in Riga and are housed initially at Jumpravuiža under atrocious conditions; many are shot by the Arājs Kommando in the Biķernieki forest, others are transferred to Salaspils to continue the construction of the concentration camp there.
- 8 Dec 1941: Second day of Rumbula; approximately 12,000 more Latvian Jews from the ghetto are murdered.
- 16 Mar 1942: First Dünamünde Action. 1,900 Reich Jews from the ghetto are murdered.
- 25 Mar 1942: Second Dünamünde Action. 1,840 Reich Jews from Jumpravmuiža are murdered.
- 31 Oct 1942: Execution of the Latvian ghetto police.
- July 1943: Transfer of ghetto occupants to Kaiserwald (Mežaparks) concentration camp begins.
- 8 Oct 1943: Transfer of Liepāja Ghetto survivors to Riga Ghetto
- 2 Nov 1943: About 2,000 people, including children, their caregivers, the old and the sick, are transported from the ghetto to Auschwitz concentration camp.
- End of Nov 1943: All Jews removed from the ghetto, either by transport to another camp or by murder.

== Sources ==
=== Historiographical ===
- (in German) Angrick, Andrej, and Klein, Peter, Die "Endlösung" in Riga. Ausbeutung und Vernichtung 1941–1944, Darmstadt 2006, ISBN 3-534-19149-8
- Wolff, Jeannette, published in Boehm, Eric H., ed., We Survived: Fourteen Histories of the Hidden and Hunted in Nazi Germany, Boulder, Colo. : Westview Press, 2003 ISBN 0-8133-4058-6
- Dobroszycki, Lucjan, and Gurock, Jeffrey S., The Holocaust in the Soviet Union : studies and sources on the destruction of the Jews in the Nazi-occupied territories of the USSR, 1941–1945
- Ezergailis, Andrew, The Holocaust in Latvia 1941–1944—The Missing Center, Historical Institute of Latvia (in association with the United States Holocaust Memorial Museum) Riga 1996 ISBN 9984-9054-3-8
- (in German) Gottwald, Alfred, and Shulle, Diana, Die "Judendeportationen" aus dem Deutschen Reich 1941–1945 Wiesbaden 2005, ISBN 3-86539-059-5
- Hilberg, Raul, The destruction of the European Jews, (3d ed.) New Haven, Connecticut; London : Yale University Press 2003 ISBN 0-300-09592-9
- Kaufmann, Max, Die Vernichtung des Judens Lettlands (The Destruction of the Jews of Latvia), Munich, 1947, English translation by Laimdota Mazzarins available on-line as Churbn Lettland – The Destruction of the Jews of Latvia (all references in this article are to page numbers in the on-line edition)
- Press, Bernhard, The murder of the Jews in Latvia, 1941–1945, Evanston, Ill. : Northwestern University Press, 2000 ISBN 0-8101-1729-0
- Schneider, Gertrude, Journey into terror: story of the Riga Ghetto, (2d Ed.) Westport, Conn. : Praeger, 2001 ISBN 0-275-97050-7

=== War crimes trials and evidence ===
- Bräutigam, Otto, Memorandum dated 18 Dec. 1941, "Jewish Question re correspondence of 15 Nov. 1941" translated and reprinted in Office of the United States Chief of Counsel For Prosecution of Axis Criminality, OCCPAC: Nazi Conspiracy and Aggression, Exhibit 3666-PS, Volume VII, pages 978–995, USGPO, Washington, D.C. 1946 ("Red Series")
- Lohse, Hinrich, Directions concerning treatment of Jewish property 13 October 1941, translated and reprinted in Office of the United States Chief of Counsel For Prosecution of Axis Criminality, Nazi Conspiracy and Aggression, Exhibit 342-PS, Volume III, pages 264–265, USGPO, Washington, D.C. 1946 ("Red Series")
- Stahlecker, Franz W., "Comprehensive Report of Einsatzgruppe A Operations up to 15 October 1941", Exhibit L-180, translated in part and reprinted in Office of the United States Chief of Counsel For Prosecution of Axis Criminality, OCCPAC Nazi Conspiracy and Aggression, Volume VII, pages 978–995, USGPO, Washington, D.C. 1946 ("Red Series")

=== Personal accounts ===
- Abstract: Berman, Joseph, "Ascension Commando"; testimony against Max Gymnich, 1 Dec 1947, provided to the former Association of Baltic Jews, full statement available on line at Weiner Library, Document 057-EA-1222
- Landau, Antoine, Evidence against various Nazi criminals in Latvia, statement dated May 25, 1948, provided to the Association of Baltic Jews, available on line at Weiner Library (abstract is in English; statement is in German)
- Michelson, Frida, I Survived Rumbuli, (translated from Russian and edited by Wolf Goodman), The Holocaust Library, New York 1979 ISBN 0-89604-030-5
- Smith, Lyn, Remembering: Voices of the Holocaust, Carroll & Graf, New York 2005 ISBN 0-7867-1640-1

=== Newsreels, films and books ===
- (in German) Fritz Bauer Institut · Cinematographie des Holocaust (describes in detail the Nazi propaganda newsreel DEUTSCHE WOCHENSCHAU // [NR. 567 / 30 / 16.07.1941] ///, which includes scenes which the film says are of war damage in Riga, Latvians lining streets and welcoming German soldiers, NKVD atrocities, Jews forced to clean up war damage, Jews being attacked by angry Latvians, and the burning of the Great Choral Synagogue.)
- "The Odessa File" by Frederick Forsyth.. The book contains a fictionalized description of the Riga Ghetto. The plot of the book states a German Freelance Journalist trying to track down "Butcher of Riga" for personal reasons. The book has been criticized as "lurid" and containing many historical inaccuracies. Researcher Matteo San Filippo however notes that Forsyth "was writing a thriller, not an historical essay."
- "We did survive it" – The Riga Ghetto by Jürgen Hobrecht Berlin 2015

=== Websites ===
- Great Choral Synagogue, at Rumbula.org
