= Eduard Strauch =

Nazi SS officer and war criminal

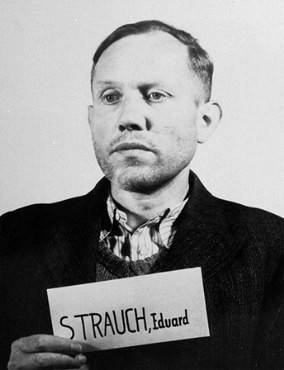
- Strauch's mugshot at the Nuremberg Military Tribunal, 1947
- Born: 17 August 1906; Essen, Rhine Province, Kingdom of Prussia, German Empire
- Died: 15 September 1955 (aged 49); Uccle, Belgium
- Education: University of Erlangen; University of Münster
- Military career
- Allegiance: Nazi Germany
- Branch: Schutzstaffel
- Service years: 1931–1945
- Rank: SS-Obersturmbannführer
- Units: Sicherheitspolizei (SiPo) and Sicherheitsdienst (SD)
- Commands: Commander, Einsatzkommando 2; Commander, SiPo and SD Weißruthenien; Brussels
- Conflicts: World War II

Eduard Strauch (17 August 1906 – 15 September 1955) was a German lawyer, SS-Obersturmbannführer and convicted war criminal. During the Second World War, he served as the commander of Einsatzkommando 2 during the invasion of the Soviet Union and participated in the Rumbula massacre. He was also the local Kommandeur of the security police (German: Sicherheitspolizei), or Sipo, and the security service (German: Sicherheitsdienst, or SD), first in the Generalbezirk Weißruthenien and later in Brussels. In October 1944, he was transferred to the Waffen-SS.

After the end of the war, Strauch was convicted for crimes against humanity in the Einsatzgruppen Trial and sentenced to death. Extradited to Belgium, he was again convicted and sentenced to death for war crimes. However, he was not executed, as he was judged mentally ill. He died in a Belgian hospital in 1955.

== Early life ==
Strauch was born in Essen, the son of a factory foreman. In his youth, he joined the nationalist and antisemitic Young German Order and remained a member until 1927. He first studied theology at the universities of Erlangen (now Erlangen-Nuremberg) and Münster, but changed his course of studies and graduated with a degree in law. He passed his first state law examination in 1932 and his second state law examination in 1935. On 1 August 1931, he joined the Nazi Party (membership number 623,392) and its paramilitary unit, the Sturmabteilung (SA). On 1 December 1931, he transferred to become a member of the Schutzstaffel (SS membership number 19,312). As of December 1934, he began working for the SS intelligence service, the SD, headed by Reinhard Heydrich.

== Crimes against humanity ==
Some months after the German invasion of the Soviet Union in June 1941, Strauch on 4 November assumed command of Einsatzkommando 2, a component of Einsatzgruppe A, which was under the command of Franz Walter Stahlecker. On 30 November 1941, Strauch and 20 men under his command participated in the Rumbula massacre in which 10,600 Jews of Riga were murdered in the Rumbula forest near the city. In February 1942, he was promoted to Kommandeur der Sicherheitspolizei und des SD (KdS), commanding all security police and SD units in the Generalbezirk Weißruthenien, with headquarters in Minsk.

In July 1943, the Nazi Generalkommissar for White Russia, Wilhelm Kube, reported on having had a conference with the "extremely capable … chief of the SD, SS-Obersturmbannführer Dr. jur. Strauch", who had caused "the liquidation of 55,000 Jews in just the past 10 weeks alone." However, Strauch and Kube reportedly did not get along and, on July 25, 1943, Strauch denounced Kube for not taking vigorous enough action against the Jews. Strauch also was criticized within the SS for alleged alcohol abuse. Strauch's promotion to SS-Standartenführer was denied. On 31 May 1944, he was transferred to the post of KdS for Brussels. In October 1944, Strauch was transferred to the Waffen-SS.

== Post-war trials and convictions ==
Despite an effort to sham mental illness, Strauch was convicted by a US military tribunal in the Einsatzgruppen Trial for playing a key role in the Rumbula massacre and a number of other mass murders in Eastern Europe. On 9 April 1948, Presiding judge Michael Musmanno pronounced the tribunal's sentence on Strauch:

Defendant EDUARD STRAUCH, on the counts of the indictment on which you have been convicted, the Tribunal sentences you to death by hanging.

Unlike his co-defendants Otto Ohlendorf and Paul Blobel, Strauch did not hang. Instead, he was extradited for trial to authorities in Belgium. The court in Liege convicted him of killing prisoners of war and he was sentenced to death, but this sentence likewise was never carried out since the Belgians were convinced that he was indeed mentally ill. Strauch died in custody on 15 September 1955 in a hospital in Uccle, Belgium.
