= Frida Michelson =

Latvian-born Holocaust survivor and memorist

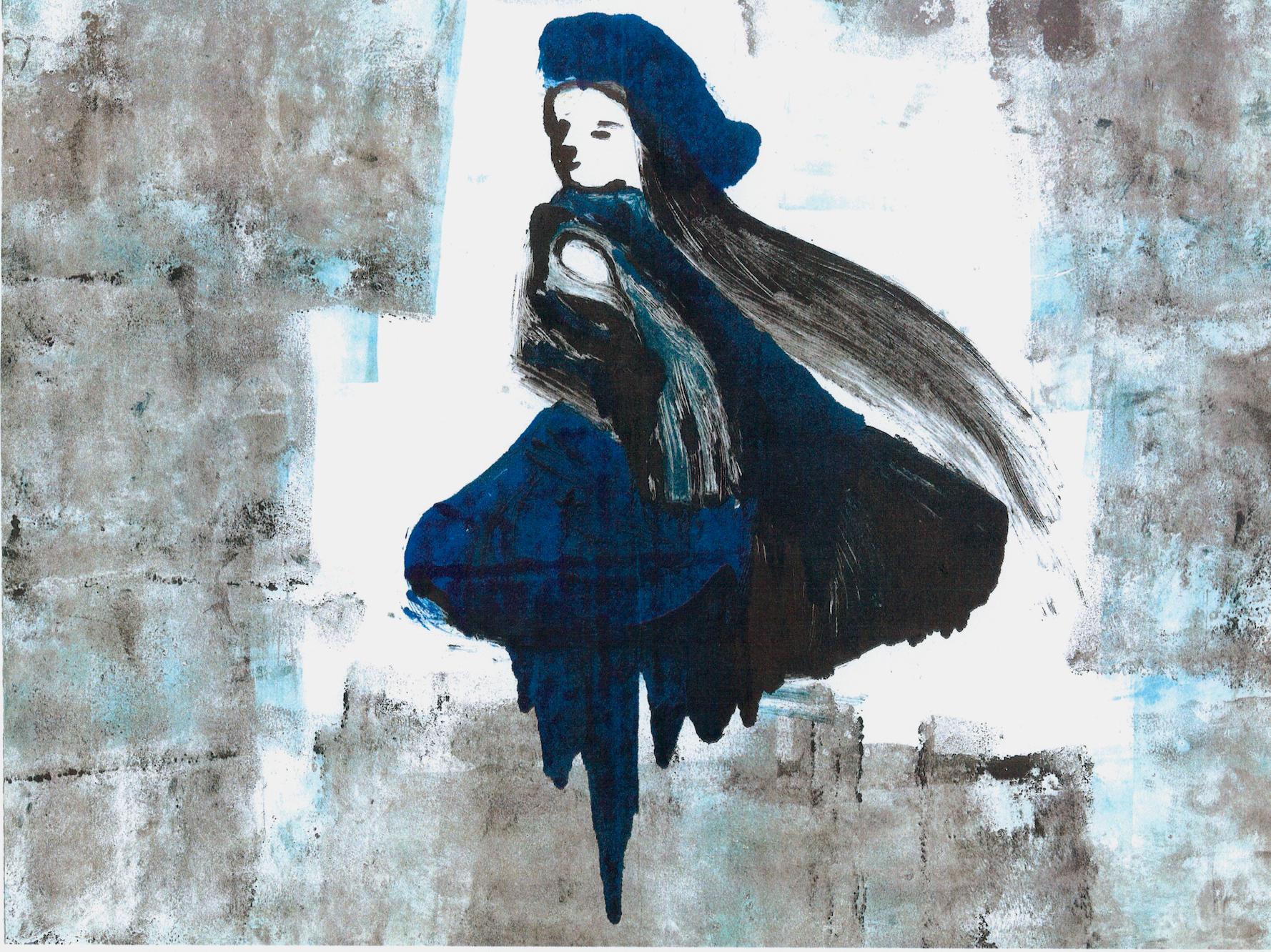
Frida Michelson, 2004, lithography (created by the Latvian painter Daina Skadmane)

Frida Michelson (Latvian: Frīda Mihelsone, née Fride; 1906–1982) was a Latvian Jew and Holocaust survivor. She is known for her memoirs “I survived Rumbula” which records the Holocaust in Latvia, her life in the Riga Ghetto and how she managed to survive the massacre in Rumbula forest. She was one of only three survivors.

== Biography ==
=== Before the Nazi occupation ===
Michelson was born in Jaungulbene, in the Governorate of Livonia of the Russian Empire (now Latvia) in 1906. She grew up in Varakļāni but moved to Riga in the 1930s to work as a seamstress.

=== During the Nazi occupation ===
In 1941, during the Nazi occupation of Latvia, she was imprisoned at the Riga Ghetto. In two days at the end of 1941 the majority of those imprisoned at the Riga Ghetto were taken to the Rumbula forest, in the outskirts of Riga, and murdered (see Rumbula massacre). Michelson was a witness to the first day, 30 November, when she saw thousands of Jews removed from the ghetto. On the other day, 8 December, she was also removed from the ghetto and was forced to march with thousands of others to Rumbula. However, she escaped being murdered by throwing herself into the snow when approaching the site of the massacre. She then pretended to be dead. The other Jews were forced to take off their shoes which were thrown into a pile on top of Michelson. She continued pretending to be dead and kept hiding under the pile of shoes. Michelson hid in the forest for the next three years, and with the help of local people managed to survive the Nazi occupation.

=== After the Nazi occupation ===
Michelson married Mordehajs Michelsons and together they had two children. In 1950 Mordehajs Michelsons was deported to Siberia due to false accusations. In 1971 Frida Michelson and her children left the Soviet Union and moved to Israel.

== I Survived Rumbula ==
In the 1960s, Frida Michelson wrote down her memories of the Holocaust and the Nazi occupation in Latvia, in her native language, Yiddish. The original copy is kept in the archives of the Jews of Latvia Museum. Michelson's writings were translated into Russian and adapted by David Silberman creating the book "I Survived Rumbula". The book was later translated into English and to Latvian. A German translation appeared in 2020, 60 years after her written memories.
