= Dünamünde Action =

1942 Nazi operation in Latvia

- Location within Latvia
- Also known as: Aktion Dünamünde
- Location: Biķernieki forest, Riga, Latvia; 56°58′04″N 24°12′47″E
- Date: 15–26 March 1942
- Incident type: Mass shootings
- Perpetrators: Kurt Krause, Eduard Roschmann, Gerhard Maywald
- Organizations: SS; Arajs Kommando
- Victims: 3,740
- Memorials: Bikernieki Memorial

The Dünamünde Action (German: Aktion Dünamünde) were two mass killings of Jews committed by the SS and the Arajs Kommando in Biķernieki forest near Riga, Latvia in March 1942. It is sometimes separated into the First Dünamünde Action on 15 March and the Second Dünamünde Action on 26 March.

The objective of the Dünamünde Action was to execute Jews from Central Europe who were deported to the overcrowded Riga Ghetto in German-occupied Latvia. Victims were lured by a false promise of better living conditions and easier work in the town of Dünamünde but were instead taken to Biķernieki forest, executed, and buried in mass graves. An estimated 3,740 people were killed in the Dünamünde action, most of whom were elderly, sick, or children and their mothers. About 1,900 people from Riga Ghetto were killed in the first action, and 1,840 from the Jungfernhof concentration camp in the second.

== Background ==
By late 1941, Nazi Germany was deporting Jews from Germany, Austria, Bohemia and Moravia to the Baltic states which it was occupying at the time. Many were intended to be sent to the Riga Ghetto, but this was becoming overcrowded and did not have the capacity to house the new arrivals, causing an "overflow" of Jewish deportees in Latvia. In December 1941, Kurt Krause, a former Berlin police detective whom the author Max Kauffman describes as the "man-eater", became the German commandant of the Riga ghettos. His assistant, Max Gymnich, was a Gestapo agent from Cologne. Krause and Gymnich used dogs to help enforce their commands. A Latvian Jewish survivor called Joseph Berman, is recorded as stating the following about Gymnich:

Gymnich personally selected the victims for deportation which meant certain death. Hence the name "Himmelsfahrtskommando -- Ascension Commando." He knew that they would never reach their alleged destination of Dünamünde or the fish tinning factory at Bolderaa. Gymnich was Obersturmführer Krause's and later Untersturmführer Roschmann's driver.

By 10 February 1942, around 20,057 Jews had been deported to Riga. Approximate populations of German Jews in the vicinity of Riga were 2,500 at Jungfernhof concentration camp, 11,000 at the German section of the Riga Ghetto, and 1,300 at Salaspils concentration camp. About 3,500 Latvian Jewish men and 300 women were in the Latvian section of the Riga Ghetto. Many others had been murdered upon arrival. According to German ghetto survivor Gertrude Schneider, the inhabitants of the ghetto did not realize how many German Jews had been killed following deportation. They remained under the impression that deportation and forced labor were the worst things that were going to happen:

Even from a historical perspective, the odds for the survivors did not seem too bad. As for the inmates of the German ghetto, they did not know that one-fourth of their number had already been exterminated. To them it was clear that they had been "resettled" as forced laborers, and they were able to live with that idea. Accordingly, they hoped that their strength would last until the war was over; they settled down in the ghetto and began to regard it as their home.

== The Dünamünde actions ==
In March 1942, the Nazi authorities in Riga decided the German ghetto was getting too crowded and organized what came to be called the "Dünamünde Action" to reduce the population. The word "action" was a euphemism employed by the Nazis to describe mass shootings and later this was picked up by the ghetto inmates themselves. The Nazis ordered each of the groups in the German ghetto to prepare a list of between 60 and 120 people for further "resettlement", with the Berlin group required to name 600. The Nazis informed the local Judenrat that the people, who were mostly unable to work such as elderly, infirm, or mothers with young children, would go to a supposed town called Dünamünde to work at a fish canning plant. Dünamünde was located northwest of Riga at the mouth of the Daugava on the Gulf of Riga, which made the story believable. Obersturmführer Gerhard Maywald conceived the ruse, which succeeded as many people were anxious to go, though there was to be no resettlement of any kind.

An estimated 3,740 people were killed in the two actions at Biķernieki forest, with most of the killings being done by 10 members of the Arajs Kommando, a Latvian pro-Nazi collaborator group.

=== First action ===
On Sunday 15 March 1942, despite the Nazis only calling for 1,500 to be selected, about 1,900 Jews assembled in the streets of the ghetto, including, as with the Rumbula massacre, many parents with small children. Instead the people were taken on buses to Biķernieki forest on the north side of Riga, where they were shot and buried in unmarked mass graves.

On 16 and 17 March, several vans returned to the Riga Ghetto carrying the personal property of those sent to Dünamünde. Residents became suspicious, particularly after a detail was assigned to sort and clean these items, many of the items were recognized by name tags and other indications of ownership. The clothing bore mudstains and signs of having been hastily removed. For example, stockings were still attached to garters.

=== Second action ===
On 26 March 1942, the same ruse was perpetrated at Jungfernhof concentration camp against the older German Jews. The camp's commander, Rudolf Seck, refused young people of working age the permission to go with their parents. A total of 1,840 people were taken to Biķernieki forest where they were also shot like those from the Riga Ghetto 11 days earlier. The method employed, called Sardinenpackung ("sardine packing"), had been designed by the infamous Einsatzgruppen commander Friedrich Jeckeln. The historians Richard L. Rubenstein and John K. Roth describe Jeckeln's system:

In the western Ukraine, SS General Friedrich Jeckeln notices that the haphazard arrangement of the corpses meant an inefficient use of burial space. More graves would have to be dug than absolutely necessary. Jeckeln solved the problem. He told a colleague at one of the Ukrainian killing sites, 'Today we'll stack them like sardines.' Jeckeln called his solution Sardinenpackung (sardine packing). When this method was employed, the victims climbed into the grave and lay down on the bottom. Cross fire from above dispatched them. Then another batch of victims was ordered into the grave, positioning themselves on top of the corpses in a head-to-foot configuration. They too were killed by cross-fire from above. The procedure continued until the grave was full.

Victims were forced to lie face down on the trench floor, or more often, on the bodies of the people who had just been shot. To save ammunition, each person was shot just once, in the back of the head. Anyone not killed outright was simply buried alive when the pit was covered up. After the war, when a number of the Einsatzgruppen commanders were placed on trial before the Nuremberg Military Tribunal in the Einsatzgruppen case, the tribunal found that "one defendant did not exclude the possibility that an executee could only seem to be dead because of shock or temporary unconsciousness. In such cases it was inevitable he would be buried alive."

== See also ==
- Bikernieki Memorial
