= Rudolf Joachim Seck =

Nazi war criminal

- Born: 15 July 1908; Bunsoh, Kingdom of Prussia, German Empire
- Died: 4 June 1974 (aged 65); Flensburg, Schleswig-Holstein, West Germany
- Known for: Commandant of Jungfernhof concentration camp
- Motive: Nazism
- Convictions: Murder; Infliction of grievous bodily harm
- Penalty: Life imprisonment with hard labour

Rudolf Joachim Seck (15 July 1908 – 4 June 1974) was an SS-Oberscharführer (staff sergeant) during World War II. During the war, Seck committed many atrocities for which he was later sentenced to serve life in prison by a West German court.

== Activities during World War II ==
Seck held the SS ranks of Unterscharführer and later Oberscharführer (staff sergeant). He was the commander of Jungfernhof concentration camp, near Riga, Latvia. His office was at the Gestapo headquarters in Riga on Reimerstrasse.

According to Joseph Berman, a Jewish man from Ventspils and a survivor of The Holocaust in Latvia, who was assigned to the work detail cleaning Seck's automobile, Seck was closely associated with Rudolf Lange, the main SS leader in occupied Latvia. Seck made it a habit to meet, at the Šķirotava Railway Station, trains of Jews deported from Germany, Austria, or Czechoslovakia. Theoretically these Jews were to be sent to the Riga Ghetto or the Jungfernhof or Salaspils concentration camps, but usually this did not occur, as Seck would instead take them to Biķernieki or Rumbula forests, near Riga, and shoot them.

Seck also traveled about Latvia, the Baltic states and Belarus with Nazi convoys to fight partisans or liquidate various camps and ghettos. The Gestapo maintained a clothing depot in Riga, on Peterholm Street, where the belongings of murdered Jews would be collected. Seck was seen at the clothing depot appropriating for himself suitcases of new clothing and jewelry. Seck personally beat and maltreated prisoners on a regular basis.

Seck was responsible for selecting between 1600 and 1700 Jews from among the Jungfernhof concentration camp inmates to be transported, on 26 March 1942, to the Biķernieki forest to be murdered in what became known as the Dünamünde Action.

== Convicted of crimes against humanity ==
Following the war, Seck was arrested by the British and sent to an internment camp. He was supposed to be tried by a British military court for atrocities in Latvia, albeit the trial was cancelled. Seck was released in January 1949, but re-arrested in May 1949. In July 1949, a denazification court classified him as a major offender years in prison. In 1951, Seck was convicted for his atrocities in Latvia sentenced to life in prison. Among his crimes were his personal murder of eight Jews, including seven in Jungfernhof. The court described these murders as follows:

One day in January or February 1942, the witness Le., who was on the Hamburg transport that arrived in Jungfernhof in December 1941 where she worked in the sewing room, walked across the yard looking for Seck from whom she required further instructions regarding a sewing job for him.

She observed the accused leave the so-called men's block driving five old men before him. The witness stopped near the accused; the five people had to stand to attention and then kneel (...) She addressed the accused with her question regarding the sewing work but received no answer. The accused repelled her with a movement of the hand and began to shoot the Jews one after the other with a shot in the back of the neck from a distance of 2 to 3 metres. When the witness tried to run away after the first shot, the accused threatened to shoot her, if she did not remain. The witness was forced to witness the further shootings.

The accused then shot the other four Jews. Between the individual shootings he paused to insult his victims by calling them lazy or venereal dogs. (...)

Seck was released from prison in 1964, and died in 1974.

== Sources ==
- Berman, Josef, Affidavit dated 16 February 1949 (3 pages), Wiener Library on-line collections
- (in German) Meyer, Beate, Die Verfolgung und Ermordung der Hamburger Juden 1933-1945; Geschichte, Zeugnis, Erinnerung (The Persecution and Murder of the Jews of Hamburg 1933-1945: History, Testimony, Memory) Institut für die Geschichte der Deutschen Juden, Wallstein Verlag GmbH Hamburg 2006 ISBN 3-8353-0137-3
- Schneider, Gertrude, Journey into terror: story of the Riga Ghetto, (2d Ed.) Westport, Conn. : Praeger, 2001 ISBN 0-275-97050-7
- (in German) Justiz und NS-Verbrechen: Die Deutschen Strafverfahren wegen NS-Tötungsverbrechen (Justice and Nazi Crimes: The German criminal prosecution of Nazi homicidal offenses), University of Amsterdam On-line database of West German and East German prosecutions. Chiefly in German but with significant portions in the English language.
