= Arajs Kommando =

Latvian Nazi collaborating unit that perpetrated the Holocaust

- German: Sonderkommando Arajs; Latvian: Arāja komanda
- Emblem of the Sicherheitsdienst used by the Arajs Kommando.
- Active: 1941—1943
- Allegiance: Nazi Germany
- Branch: Sicherheitsdienst
- Size: >100 (July 1941) – 1,500 (1943)
- War crimes: The Holocaust in Latvia; The Holocaust in Belarus; The Holocaust in Soviet Russia

Commanders
- Commander: Viktors Arājs
- Deputy commander: Herberts Cukurs

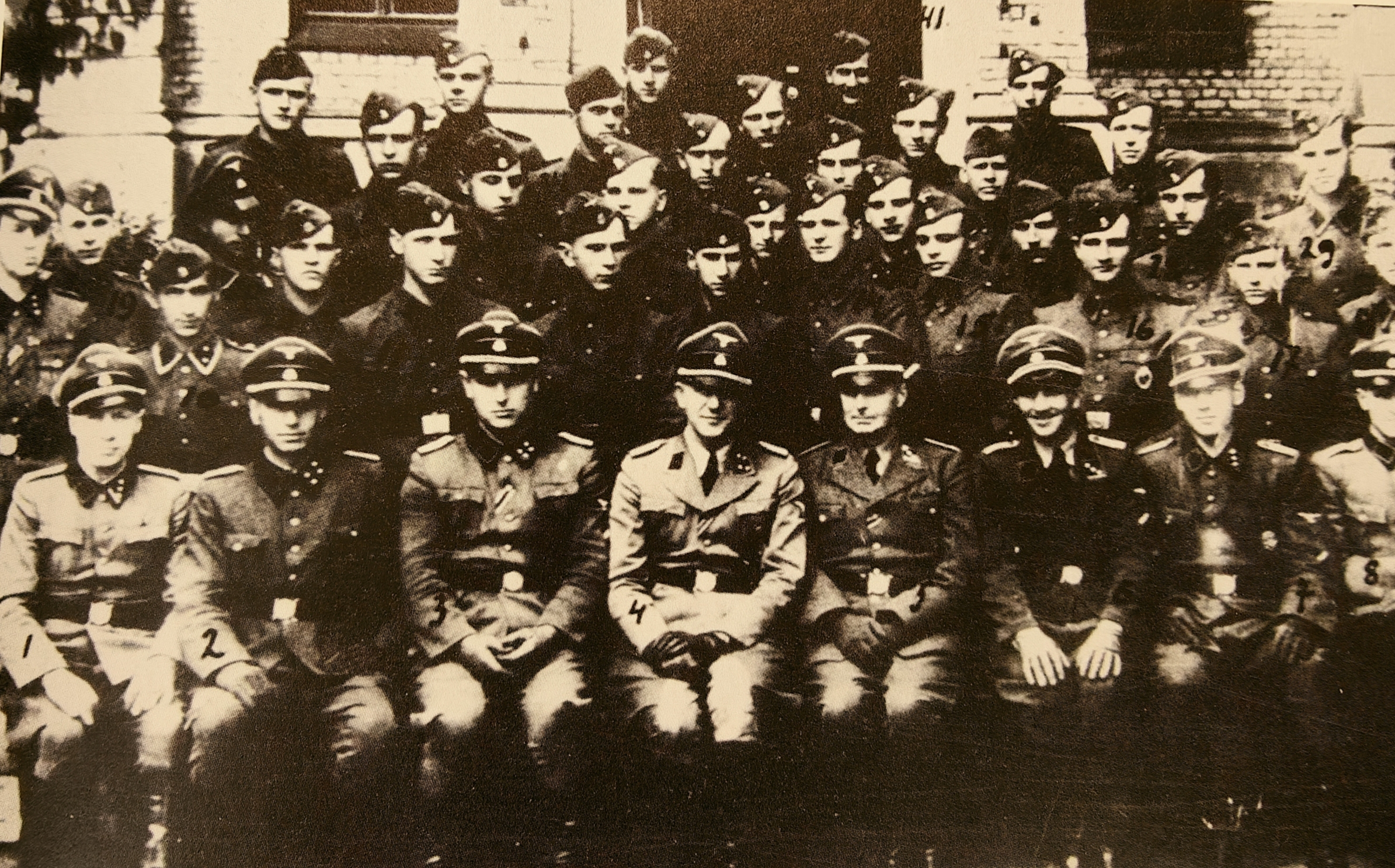
Arajs and the Kommando, 1942; Arajs is third from left on the front row

The Arajs Kommando (Latvian: Arāja komanda; German: Sonderkommando Arajs) was a paramilitary unit of the Sicherheitsdienst (SD) active in German-occupied Latvia from 1941 to 1943. It was led by SS commander and Nazi collaborator Viktors Arājs and composed of ethnic Latvian volunteers recruited by Arājs.

The Arajs Kommando was a notorious death squad and one of the main perpetrators of the Holocaust in Latvia. The unit was involved in the mass killing of Jews in Latvia until 1942 when it was used in anti-partisan operations in Belarus and Russia. It was disbanded and merged into the Latvian Legion in 1943.

== Formation ==
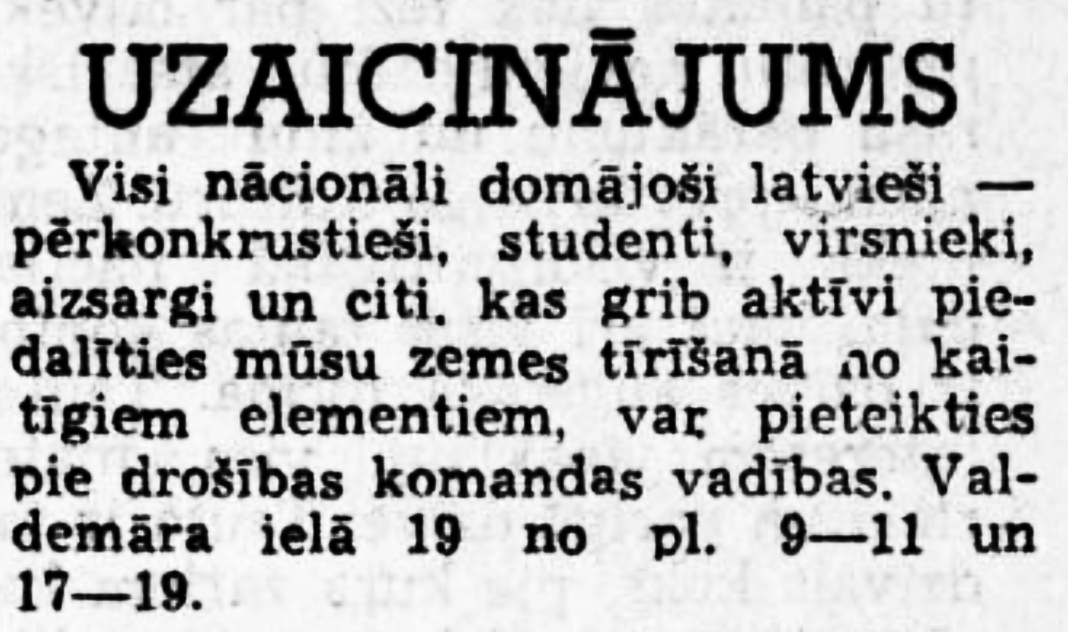
July 1941 advertisement to recruit Commando members, addressed to All nationally minded Latvians – Pērkonkrusts members, students, officers, Aizsargi, and others who want to actively participate in cleaning our land of harmful elements.

In July 1941, Nazi Germany began its military occupation of Latvia, previously occupied by the Soviet Union for the prior year, shortly after the German invasion of the Soviet Union. One of earliest and most enthusiastic Latvian collaborators was Viktors Arājs, a former policeman and Latvian Army soldier. On 1 July, after the entry of the Germans into Riga, Arājs made contact with SS-Brigadeführer Walter Stahlecker through the help of Hans Dressler, a close friend and translator. Stahlecker was head of the Einsatzgruppe A (Army Group North) and the Sicherheitsdienst (SD), the intelligence agency of the SS, in Reichskommissariat Ostland. Stahlecker was impressed by Arājs and instructed him to set up a temporary paramilitary unit to be used against "undesirables" in Latvia. The following day, on 2 July, Stahlecker told Arājs that his commando group was to unleash a pogrom against Latvian Jews that looked spontaneous.

On 4 July 1941, Arājs issued a recruitment advertisement in Tēvija, a collaborationist newspaper published in Riga, but it received little response. Instead, Arājs relied on his connections at the University of Riga, as well as the Latvian army which had been disbanded by the Soviets. By 5 July, the unit had acquired a headquarters at 19 Krišjāņa Valdemāra Street in Riga and was referred to as by the Germans as "auxiliary police". All members were ethnic Latvian volunteers. They were former policemen and soldiers, members of the Aizsargi (an Interwar period Latvian militia), and students recruited by Arājs. Initially they used civilian clothing, but soon began to wear Latvian Army or Aizsargi dark blue uniforms with green armbands on the right arm with the SD insignia. By the end of July, the unit size was 240 men.

== Activity ==
=== Latvia ===
The Arajs Kommando immediately began to participate in Nazi atrocities, including the killing of Jews, Roma, Soviet collaborators, mental patients, as well as punitive actions and massacres of civilians along Latvia's border with the Soviet Union. Their first order from Stahlecker was to forcibly search the homes of Riga Jews and arrest male residents – the purpose of the order was to provoke Jews to riot but this did not occur. On the night of 4 July, the Arajs Kommando were participants in the burning of Riga's synagogues. Men of the unit did not allow the firefighters to save the synagogues, ordering them to only prevent the fires from spreading to neighbouring buildings. Several hundred Jews were burned alive in the synagogues. During the ensuing chaos in Riga, Kommando members (and others) looted Jewish houses. As can be seen in contemporary Nazi newsreels, these attacks were part of a campaign to create the perception that the Holocaust in the Baltics was local, and not Nazi-directed.

Commemoration of this event has been chosen for marking Holocaust Memorial Day in present-day Latvia.

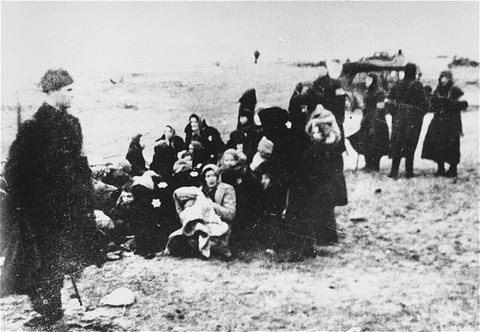
Arajs Kommando members on the beach in Liepāja, 1941, preparing to murder a group of Jewish women

The Arajs Kommando subsequently took part in increasingly violent events such as the Liepāja massacres, where they were brought in from Riga to carry out the shootings of 910 Jews, on 24 July and 25 July 1941. This Arājs action was later described by Georg Rosenstock, the commander of the second company of the 13th Police Reserve battalion. Rosenstock testified after the war that when he and his unit had arrived in Liepāja in July 1941, they had heard that Jews were being continuously executed, all through the daylight hours in the town, and that German marines were making stops in the area just to watch the executions.

The Arajs Kommando participated in the Rumbula massacre, in which 24,000 Latvian Jews from the Riga Ghetto (mostly women, children, and the elderly) and 1,000 German Jews (deported by train from Central Europe) were executed on the outskirts of Riga or in the nearby Rumbula forest during the two days of 30 November and 8 December 1941. Arajs Kommando members served as guards in charge of "funnelling" the thousands of Jews from Riga to pits in the forest to be shot, At the end of the second day, some victims who had been shot and wounded in the streets of Riga were executed by the Arajs Kommando.

Some Kommando members also served as guards at the Jungfernhof and Salaspils concentration camps.

A squad of 10 men from the Arajs Kommando served as executioners during the Dünamünde Action in Riga on 15 and 26 March 1942.

=== Belarus and Russia ===
By mid-1942, as the number of Jews and other "undesirables" in Latvia had dwindled, the Arajs Kommando was repurposed with anti-partisan operations in German-occupied parts of Belarus and Russia. Its first actions outside of Latvia were in the Pskov-Velikiye Luki region across the border from Latvia. During the latter half of 1942, it participated in a number of German anti-partisan and forced labour operations which involved mass killings. From February to March 1943, the unit played a major role in Operation Winterzauber, where it was involved in the execution of nearly 4,000 partisans or those suspected of supporting them.

The Arajs Kommando numbered about 300 to 500 men during the period that it participated in the killings of Latvian Jews, and up to 1,500 members at its peak at the height of its involvement in anti-partisan operations. In late 1943, the Arajs Kommando was disbanded as part of a reorganisation of the Latvian SD and its personnel transferred to the Latvian Legion, with Arajs being placed in charge of the III Battalion. It is estimated to have killed around 26,000 Jews during its existence.

== Prosecution ==
A total of 356 Arajs Kommando members have been identified. Between 1944 and 1966, 352 of them were prosecuted, found guilty, and sentenced by the Soviets, albeit one case was later suspended.

Sentence	Number of those sentenced
Death	44 (30 executed)
25 years imprisonment with hard labor	156
20 years imprisonment with hard labor	36
15–18 years imprisonment with hard labor	43
15 years imprisonment with hard labor	10
10 years imprisonment with hard labor	76

Fourteen of the death sentences were never carried out since the Soviets temporarily abolished capital punishment between 1947 and 1949, thus saving the lives of those tried and condemned during that time period. The most frequently imposed sentence was 25 years in prison with hard labor, and forfeiture of civil rights for five years, plus forfeiture of all property. After the dissolution of the Soviet Union, Latvian courts rehabilitated more than 40 of those convicted despite overwhelming evidence in virtually all of the cases.

After successfully hiding in West Germany for several decades after the war under an assumed name, Viktors Arājs was eventually identified by a former colleague, arrested, tried, and imprisoned for his crimes. Arājs died in prison in 1988.

Herberts Cukurs, a deputy commander of the Arajs Kommando, was assassinated by the Israeli Mossad in 1965. While living in Brazil, Cukurs was befriended by a German-speaking Mossad agent, who lured him to Uruguay, where Cukurs was ambushed, restrained, and summarily executed.

In January 2000, the governments of Canada, the United States, the United Kingdom, and Australia assisted in attempts to extradite Konrāds Kalējs, an officer of the Arajs Kommando, to Latvia for trial on charges of genocide. Kalējs died in 2001 prior to extradition, professing his innocence by stating that he was fighting Soviets on the Eastern Front or studying at university at the time. Latvian Holocaust historian Andrew Ezergailis claimed that only a third of the Arājs Kommando actively participated in the killings of Jews and that Kalējs couldn't be convicted of crimes against humanity based solely on his membership even as an officer.
