= Rudolf Lange =

Nazi German SS officer (1910–1945)

- Lange as an SS-Sturmbannführer c. 1941–1943
- Born: Martin Franz Rudolf Erwin Lange; 18 April 1910; Weißwasser, Province of Silesia, Kingdom of Prussia, German Empire
- Died: 23 February 1945 (aged 34); Posen, Warthegau, Nazi Germany
- Cause of death: Killed in action or suicide
- Military career
- Allegiance: Nazi Germany
- Branch: Schutzstaffel
- Service years: 1936–1945
- Rank: SS-Standartenführer
- Units: Gestapo
- Commands: Einsatzgruppe A, Einsatzkommando 2 SiPo and SD Commander, Latvia; SiPo and SD Commander, Wartheland
- Known for: The Holocaust in Latvia; Wannsee Conference participant
- Conflicts: Battle of Poznań (1945)
- Awards: German Cross in Gold; Iron Cross, 1st and 2nd class

Rudolf Lange (18 April 1910 – 23 February 1945) was a German SS-Standartenführer and police official during the Nazi era. After the invasion of the Soviet Union, he served in Einsatzgruppe A before becoming a commander of the Sicherheitspolizei (SiPo) and Sicherheitsdienst (SD) forces in Riga, Generalbezirk Lettland (today, Latvia). He participated in the January 1942 Wannsee Conference, at which the genocidal Final Solution to the Jewish Question was planned, and was largely responsible for implementing the murder of Latvia's Jewish population during the Holocaust. He died at the Battle of Poznań in the closing months of the Second World War in Europe.

== Early life ==
Lange was born in Weißwasser, then in Prussian Silesia, but now located in Saxony. His father was a railway construction supervisor, and the family were evangelical Protestants. Lange finished high school in Staßfurt in 1928 and studied law at the University of Halle, the Ludwig-Maximilians-Universität München and the University of Jena. While at school, he joined the anti-democratic and antisemitic fencing fraternity, Germania, and received several duelling scars. He passed his first state law examination in July 1932 and served his legal clerkship in Staßfurt, Magdeburg, Torgau and Naumburg. He completed his dissertation on the "instruction right of the employer" and received a doctor of law degree in December 1933, just after joining the Sturmabteilung (SA) on 14 November of that year. He completed his legal training at the Gestapo office of Halle in 1935, and passed the second state law examination on 18 August 1936.

== SS career in Germany ==
In September 1936, Lange was hired as a probationary employee by the Gestapo office in Berlin. On 1 May 1937, he joined the Nazi Party (membership number 4,922,869). Determined to build a career with the police, he left the SA and transferred to the Schutzstaffel (SS) (member number 290,308). In August 1937, he became a government lawyer in the civil service system and, on 30 September 1937, he was assigned to the staff of the Sicherheitsdienst (SD), the SS intelligence service. Lange adopted the SS ideology wholeheartedly and left the evangelical Protestant church in 1937.

In May 1938, just after the Anschluss with Austria, Lange was transferred to the new Gestapo office in Vienna to supervise the takeover of the Austrian police system. There, he met and worked with Franz Walter Stahlecker, who later became his commanding officer in Riga. Lange was commissioned an Untersturmführer on 6 July 1938 and, later the same year, he was promoted to Sturmführer. In Vienna, his duties involved "fighting the enemy", specifically Jews and the Catholic Church. He was involved in the persecution of Viennese Jews, including the brutal attacks, arrests and looting of property that occurred during the Kristallnacht pogrom of November 1938. In June 1939, Lange was transferred to Stuttgart as the deputy head of the Gestapo regional headquarters.

In September 1939, the security and police agencies of Nazi Germany (with the exception of the Orpo) were consolidated into the Reich Security Main Office (RSHA) of the SS, headed by Reinhard Heydrich. The Gestapo became Amt IV (Office IV) of the RSHA and Heinrich Müller became the Gestapo chief under Heydrich. Lange's career continued to advance in the new RSHA organization. In April 1940, he was promoted to Hauptsturmführer. From May to July 1940, he served as the acting head of the state police offices in Weimar and Erfurt. This was followed by an appointment as the deputy head of the office of the Inspector of the SiPo and SD in Wehrkreis (military district) IX, headquartered in Kassel. On 17 September 1940, Lange was assigned as the deputy head of the Gestapo in Berlin under Walter Blume. On 20 April 1941, he was promoted to SS-Sturmbannführer.

== Mass murderer in Latvia ==
On 5 June 1941, Lange was ordered to Pretzsch and the command staff of Einsatzgruppe A, headed by now SS-Brigadeführer und Generalmajor der Polizei Stahlecker. Lange was a Teilkommando (detachment) leader in Einsatzkommando 2, or EK2. He was one of the few people aware of the Führerbefehl or "fundamental orders" for the so-called "Jewish problem" in Latvia. According to Lange himself:

From the very beginning, the goal of EK2 was that radical solution of the Jewish problem by killing all Jews.

On 3 December 1941, he was promoted as commander of EK2, replacing Eduard Strauch. At the same time, he was also made the commander of the SiPo and SD in the newly established Generalbezirk Lettland, with the title Kommandanteur des Sicherheitspolizei und SD (KdS). He was in charge of Department IV of the SD. The department was the "hub of the whole SD organization in Latvia, the other departments served it." Matters of formal rank and titles were never clear in the Nazi occupation regime for Latvia, as the lines of authority within agencies and the relationship between one agency and others were "ambiguous, overlapping, and unclear". Nevertheless, Lange is widely recognized as one of the primary perpetrators of the Holocaust in Latvia.

His headquarters were in Riga, on Reimersa Street. From the beginning of his involvement in Latvia, Lange gave orders to squads of Latvians, such as the Arajs Kommando, that the Germans had organised to carry out massacres in the smaller cities. According to one historian, Viktors Arājs was "held on a short leash" by Lange. Another local organisation receiving orders from Lange was the Vagulāns Kommando, which was responsible for the Jelgava massacres in July and August 1941. Lange also personally supervised executions conducted by the Arājs commando. He appears to have ordered that all the SD officers should personally participate in the killings.

After the Nazi regime decided to deport Jews from Germany, Austria and Czechoslovakia to the east, Lange was in charge of receiving the deportees coming to Riga. In this connection, on 8 November 1941, he issued detailed instructions to Hinrich Lohse, who was Reichskommissar Ostland, regarding the transport of 50,000 Jews to the east, with 25,000 going to Riga and 25,000 to Belarus. At the same time, Lange was organising the construction of the Salaspils concentration camp, originally intended to accommodate these deportees. Because the Salaspils camp would not be ready by the time the Jews would arrive, Lange decided to send the transports to an abandoned estate near Riga called Jungfernhof or Jumpravmuiza, which would be set up as Jungfernhof concentration camp.

In November 1941, Lange was involved in the planning and carrying out the murder of 24,000 Latvian Jews from the Riga Ghetto, which occurred on 30 November and 8 December 1941. This crime has come to be known as the Rumbula massacre. In addition to the Latvian Jews, another 1,000 Jews from Germany were also murdered. They had been brought to Latvia on the first train of deportees, which arrived on 29 November 1941. Following the 29 November train, more rail transports of Jews began arriving in Riga from Germany, starting on 3 December 1941. The Jews on the first few transports were not immediately housed in the ghetto, but were left at the Jungfernhof concentration camp. In May 1942, Lange issued orders to SS-Obersturmführer Günter Tabbert to kill the surviving Jews in the Daugavpils Ghetto. Only about 450 Jews survived in Daugavpils after this action, which involved the killing of the sick, children, infants and hospital workers. In addition to Tabbert, the Arajs Kommando of native Latvians was responsible for a major part of these killings.

Lange was promoted to SS-Obersturmbannführer in November 1943. During the war years, he was awarded the Iron Cross, 1st and 2nd class. He remained the commander of the SiPo and SD in Latvia until January 1945. During his tenure, he continued killing operations against Jews, partisans and political opponents, some of which involved the use of gas vans. One of his last actions in Riga was in Sonderaktion 1005, the operation that used prisoners to exhume mass graves and burn the bodies of the victims of Nazi atrocities in an attempt to prevent the advancing Soviet forces from discovering them.

== Wannsee Conference ==
Minutes of the Wannsee Conference, p.2, listing Lange as a participant

Lange was invited to the Wannsee Conference in January 1942 by SS-Obergruppenführer Heydrich, the conference organizer. Lange, then an SS-Sturmbannführer, was the lowest-ranking officer present and, at 31, the youngest attendee. The minutes of the meeting specifically noted that Lange was there as the representative (Vertreter) of the commander (Befehlshaber) of SiPo and SD forces in the Reichskommissariat Ostland, who at the time was SS-Brigadeführer Franz Walter Stahlecker. Stahlecker was not invited because he was not familiar with the realities of the Jewish deportations and was not located in Riga. Heydrich viewed Lange's first-hand experience in conducting the mass murder of deported Jews, in Latvia, as valuable for the conference. Instead of Lange, Heydrich could have invited either Karl Jäger or Erich Ehrlinger, who commanded the SiPo and SD in Lithuania and Belarus respectively, and were responsible for similar massacres. He chose Lange because Riga was the main deportation destination, and because Lange's doctorate and legal acumen made him seem more intellectual than the other two men. In Ian Kershaw's biography Hitler 1936-1945 Nemesis, in the section of the book covering the beginnings of the Holocaust and the Wannsee Conference, the SS major is twice mistakenly referred to as Dr. "Otto Lange".

== Death ==
Toward the end of January 1945, Lange was appointed Commander (Befehlshaber) of the SiPo and the SD of Reichsgau Wartheland. Its capital city of Posen lay on the main route between Warsaw and Berlin and had to be taken by the Soviet Red Army before their assault on the German capital could begin. Soon after he reached the city, it was surrounded by the Red Army and was declared a "fortress city" (Festung) by Adolf Hitler. Lange, who could not have any doubts about his fate if taken prisoner, directed the police under his command with fanaticism. He was wounded during the Battle of Poznań, and the siege of the city by Soviet forces, and he was promoted to SS-Standartenführer on 30 January 1945. At Hitler's behest, on 6 February, he was awarded the German Cross in gold. The final assault on the city's citadel came on 23 February 1945, after a last-ditch defence by the remnants of the German garrison. Reports of the exact circumstances of Lange's death vary, but he is said to have been killed on or around that date, either in combat or by suicide, and is buried in the Cmentarz Miłostowo w Poznaniu military cemetery in Poznań.

== Character ==
Lange was said to have been a favourite student of Reinhard Heydrich and Heinrich Himmler. He demanded unconditional obedience from his subordinates. Joseph Berman, a survivor of one of the concentration camps administered by Lange, described him as follows:

As far as Lange is concerned, he was the biggest murderer I have ever known. To write a book about him would definitely not be enough. As he is dead, it is no use talking about him. I would, however, mention that he was one of the most notorious anti-Semites in the 20th century. He hated Jews so much that he could not look at them; one never wanted to pass him either in the motor pool or anywhere else.

Lange made himself one of the most feared officials among those responsible for the Riga ghetto. He supervised the arrival of the transports, aided by SS-Obersturmbannführer Gerhard Maywald, whom historian Gertrude Schneider, a survivor of the Riga ghetto, describes as Lange's "sidekick". Lange personally shot a young man, Werner Koppel, who he felt was not opening a railway car door fast enough. Schneider described Lange's appearance:

Even though he was somewhat smaller and darker than the blond, blue-eyed Maywald, he looked very handsome in his fur-collared uniform coat and seemed every inch an officer and a gentleman. It never occurred to the newcomers to suspect such a man of being a murderer.

== SS and police ranks ==
SS and police ranks
Date	Rank
6 July 1938	SS-Untersturmführer
9 November 1938	SS-Obersturmführer
20 April 1940	SS-Hauptsturmführer
20 April 1941	SS-Sturmbannführer
9 November 1943	SS-Obersturmbannführer
30 January 1945	SS-Standartenführer

== Decorations ==
- German Cross in Gold
- Iron Cross, 1st Class
- Iron Cross, 2nd class
- SA-Sports Badge in Bronze
- DRL-Sports Badge in Bronze

== Fictional portrayals ==
- In the 1984 German television film Die Wannseekonferenz, Lange was played by Martin Lüttge.
- In the 2001 BBC/HBO film Conspiracy, Lange was played by Barnaby Kay.
- In the 2022 German television film Die Wannseekonferenz, Lange was played by Frederic Linkemann.

== Sources ==
- Angrick, Andrej; Klein, Peter (2009). The 'Final Solution' in Riga: Exploitation and Annihilation. New York; Oxford: Berghahn Books. ISBN 978-1-84545-608-5.
- Bartrop, Paul R.; Grimm, Eve E. (2019). Perpetrating the Holocaust: Leaders, Enablers, and Collaborators. ABC-CLIO. ISBN 978-1-440-85896-3.
- Ezergailis, Andrew (1996). The Holocaust in Latvia 1941–1944—The Missing Center. Riga; Washington: Historical Institute of Latvia; United States Holocaust Memorial Museum. ISBN 9984-9054-3-8.
- Kershaw, Ian (2000). Hitler 1936-1945 Nemesis (1st American ed.). New York: W.W. Norton & Company, Inc. ISBN 0-393-32252-1.
- Klee, Ernst (2007). Das Personenlexikon zum Dritten Reich. Wer war was vor und nach 1945. Frankfurt-am-Main: Fischer-Taschenbuch-Verlag. ISBN 978-3-596-16048-8.
- Klein, Peter. Dr. Rudolf Lange als Kommandant der Sicherheitspolizei und des SD in Lettland. Aspekte seines Dienstalltags, in Wolf Kaiser (Hrsg.): Täter im Vernichtungskrieg. Der Überfall auf die Sowjetunion und der Völkermord an den Juden. Propyläen-Verlag, 2002. ISBN 3-549-07161-2.
- Klein, Peter (2017). "Rudolf Lange, Reich Main Security Office: Academic, Ideological Warrior and Mass Murderer". In Jasch, Hans-Christian; Kreutzmüller, Christoph (eds.). The Participants: The Men of the Wannsee Conference. New York: Berghahn Books. ISBN 978-1-785-33671-3.
- Klein, Peter (7 January 2023). "Lange, Rudolf". In Jordan, Stefan (ed.). NDB-online (in German). Munich: Historical Commission of the Bavarian Academy of Sciences and Humanities.
- Lumans, Valdis O. (2006). Latvia in World War II. New York: Fordham University Press. ISBN 0-8232-2627-1.
- Mueller, Jakob (18 January 2022). "Dr. Rudolf Lange (1910 – 1945)" (PDF). Gedenk- und Bildungsstätte Haus der Wannsee-Konferenz (in German). Berlin: Erinnern für die Zukunft - Trägerverein des Hauses der Wannsee-Konferenz e.V.
- Patzwall, Klaus D.; Scherzer, Veit (2001). Das Deutsche Kreuz 1941 – 1945 Geschichte und Inhaber Band II (in German). Norderstedt, Germany: Verlag Klaus D. Patzwall. ISBN 3-931533-45-X.
- "Rudolf Lange". olokaustos.org. Archived from the original on 31 December 2001.
- Schneider, Gertrude (2001). Journey Into Terror: Story of the Riga Ghetto. Westport, Conn: Praeger. ISBN 0-275-97050-7.
