= Bikernieki Memorial =

War memorial to the Holocaust victims of World War II in Biķernieki forest

Biķernieki Memorial
- Biķernieku memoriāls
- German War Graves Commission
- For The Holocaust victims
- Unveiled: November 30, 2001
- Location: 56°57′47″N 24°12′37″E
- Designed by: Sergejs Rižs
- Total burials: ≈20,000
- Earth, don't cover my blood. Let my cry have no place to rest.

Biķernieki Memorial (Latvian: Biķernieku memoriāls) is a war memorial to the Holocaust victims of World War II in Biķernieki forest in Riga, Latvia. Biķernieki forest is the biggest mass murder site during the Holocaust in Latvia with two memorial territories spanning over 80,000 square metres (860,000 sq ft) with 55 marked burial sites with around 20,000 victims still buried in total.

The memorial was initially planned and construction started in 1986, but was halted in 1991, a year after Latvia declared independence. The construction was revived in 2000 by German War Graves Commission with the help of local Latvian organisations and several German cities. It was financed mostly by German government and organisations, Austrian State Fund, and involved city donations. It was designed by Sergejs Rižs and opened on November 30, 2001.

== Description ==
The designer of the memorial was created by Latvian architect Sergejs Rižs, who worked for 15 years on the design of the memorial, saying it was "his human obligation" to devote his career to this. The memorial is located in the Biķernieki forest, Biķernieku Street which passes through the forest. There are two memorial territories – 6,550 and 79,630 square metres (70,500 and 857,100 sq ft) wide on both sides from the road. In addition to smaller forest pathways, there are two roads leading to the memorial's central square – a historic road used to bring the victims and the main central road paved with concrete slabs and marked with a concrete arc exiting to Biķernieku Street.

The centre of assembly houses a black granite cube – a symbolic altar with engraving from Book of Job 16:18 "Earth, don't cover my blood. Let my cry have no place to rest." in Latvian, Russian, German, and Hebrew languages. The immediate area is surrounded by 4,000 granite stones arranged in a grid of forty-five 4-by-4-metre (13 ft × 13 ft) squares, and resembles a traditional Jewish cemetery. The unique rough-hewn 0.2-to-1.5-metre (0.66 to 4.92 ft) high granite stones of black, gray, and reddish colors come from Zhytomyr region in Ukraine. The stones are carved with European city names representing the home towns of the victims. The entrances to the memorial and other grave sites in the forest are marked with concrete pillars with symbols representing various groups of the fallen – Star of David representing Jews, Crown of Thorns representing war prisoners, and Christian cross representing civilians. Historians from the New Synagogue Berlin – Centrum Judaicum, educational establishment House of the Wannsee Conference, and historians from the member cities have documented the names of over 31,000 victims, published in Book of Remembrance: The German, Austrian and Czechoslovakian Jews deported to the Baltic States (2003).

Despite the nature of memorial, the surrounding hills are a popular summer hiking and winter sledding and skiing location. Although Germany supplies annual funding for memorial maintenance, it is insufficient to fund regular police patrols and surveillance. The memorial and gravestones have been vandalised several times, each time attracting media attention. In 2011, two people, including a member of the Socialist Party of Latvia (who was immediately expelled), were caught after spraying a stylized image of a Nazi, swastikas and text in Latvian on the entrance arc on May 8. In February 2023, unknown vandals spray-painted the letter "Z" on the Bikernieki Memorial twice in the span of a week.

== History ==
Biķernieki forest is Latvia's biggest mass murder site during The Holocaust of World War II during years 1941–44. There are 55 marked mass burial sites in the forest. About 46,500 people were reported to have been killed there, including Latvian and Western European Jews, Soviet prisoners of war, and Nazis' political adversaries. The exact number of victims is unknown. Although the Soviet Nazi War Crime Research Committee declared over 46,000 murders, later excavations did not confirm this number. The number of victims is speculated to be closer to 30,000.

The first victims were a few thousand men arrested in July 1941 and brought from Riga Central Prison. In 1942 another 12,000 Jews were brought from Germany, Austria, and Czechoslovakia. In 1943, Riga Ghetto prisoners were brought here who were unable to work at Kaiserwald concentration camp, followed by those from the camp itself unable to work in 1944. In 1943 and onwards Nazis dug up graves and burned the bodies to hide the evidence. It is estimated that there are now around 20,000 victims buried in the forest.

== Planning and construction ==
In the 1960s, only a simple commemorative plaque was placed in the forest and the grave sites were marked with concrete borders. The plaque stated that 46,500 Soviet citizens had died and omitted mentioning nationalities. The location had been neglected and slowly degrading since. The Western free press and radio exerted pressure on USSR about how memorials and mass grave sites in USSR were left abandoned. This prompted the Riga government headed by Alfrēds Rubiks to provide finances for development and creation of infrastructure around Biķernieki. The first plans for the Biķernieki forest grave site cleanup were formed in 1986 by a team from the Komunālprojekts Institute. The team included Gaļina Lobaševa, Vija Jansone, Gaļina Alsina, Ineta Vītola, Māris Galarovskis, and Sergejs Rižs in the lead. The project received Riga City Council's approval and state funding and the works continued until 1991 when the current government was dissolved after Latvia regained its independence. The work halted at around a fifth of the completion with only the surrounding terrain cleared and central and entrance memorial signs erected.

The project was revived in 1993–94 by the initiative of Eric Herzl, an expert from Austrian Society of Memorials, who obtained the permission from Riga City Council to continue the construction work. Austria brought the project to the attention of the German War Graves Commission and more than a dozen German cities in 1999. On May 23, 2000, 13 German city representatives and the president of German War Graves Commission met in Berlin to form German Riga Committee.^{[a]} The chapter was formed to plan and build a war memorial in Biķernieki forest to commemorate the Jews deported and killed at the start of the 1940s. The project was funded by German War Graves Commission, the National Fund of the Republic of Austria, the German government including Central Council of Jews in Germany, and donations from several German town municipalities. The work was carried out by The German Commission, Latvian Fraternal Cemeteries Commission, and the Riga City Council. The projected cost was DEM 900,000 and the actual project cost DEM 1M (or LVL 285,000).

The memorial was opened on November 30, 2001, 60 years after the start of the deportations. The event was opened by the President of Latvia, Vaira Vīķe-Freiberga, who in her speech noted the importance of raising people's awareness about the events that took place there. The event was well attended, including the Latvian Prime Minister Andris Bērziņš, Latvian chief rabbi Natans Barkans, officials and ambassadors from various countries, former ghetto and concentration camp inmates, and relatives of the victims from Lithuania, Estonia, Germany, Israel, Austria, and Russia. Several research, education, and remembrance events were held after the opening ceremony. The opening and the following events received local and foreign media coverage. The opening ceremony ended with a Jewish prayer Kaddish by Riga Jewish community cantor Vlad Shulman.

== Reception ==
The architect Sergejs Rižs says he attempted to show the idea of the memorial with a "concise language of architectural forms". His goal was to encompass the surrounding terrain in line with contemporary art. Art historian Solvita Krese called the project successful and lauded the design for avoiding exaggeration of themes at hand. She also noted that the memorial fit well with the terrain. Architect Ausma Skujiņa also said the project was successful among many other less successful ones. She stressed its positive nature and how the memorial "reconciles with the pain, and evens it out." Winfried Nachtwei describes it as the "first of its kind in Eastern Europe". Historian Andrievs Ezergailis says Rižs successfully adapted and improved on the memorial concept of Treblinka, however criticises that the architect implied deaths of Russian prisoners that Ezergailis describes as inaccurate.

== Gallery ==
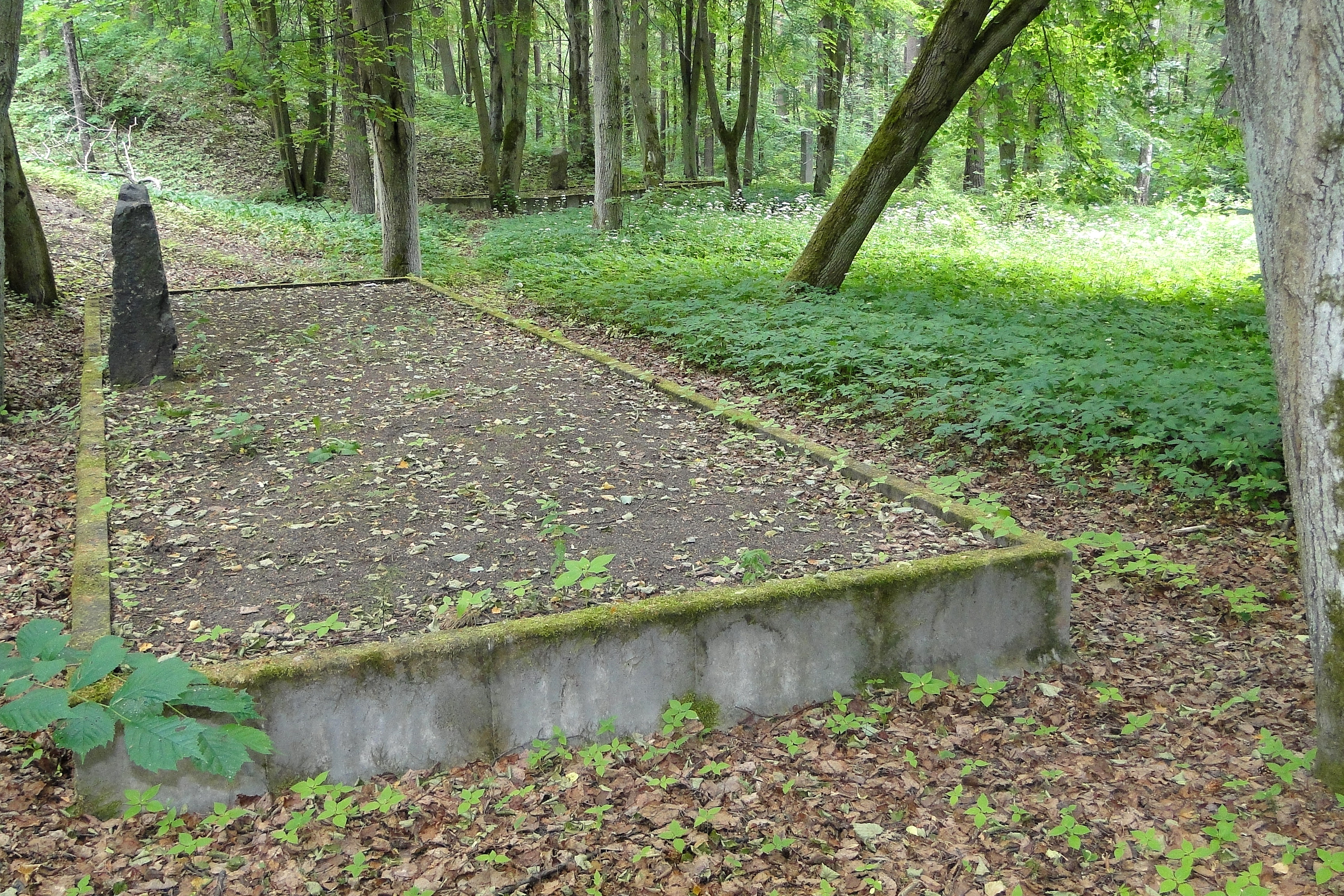
One of many gravesites in Bikernieki Forest

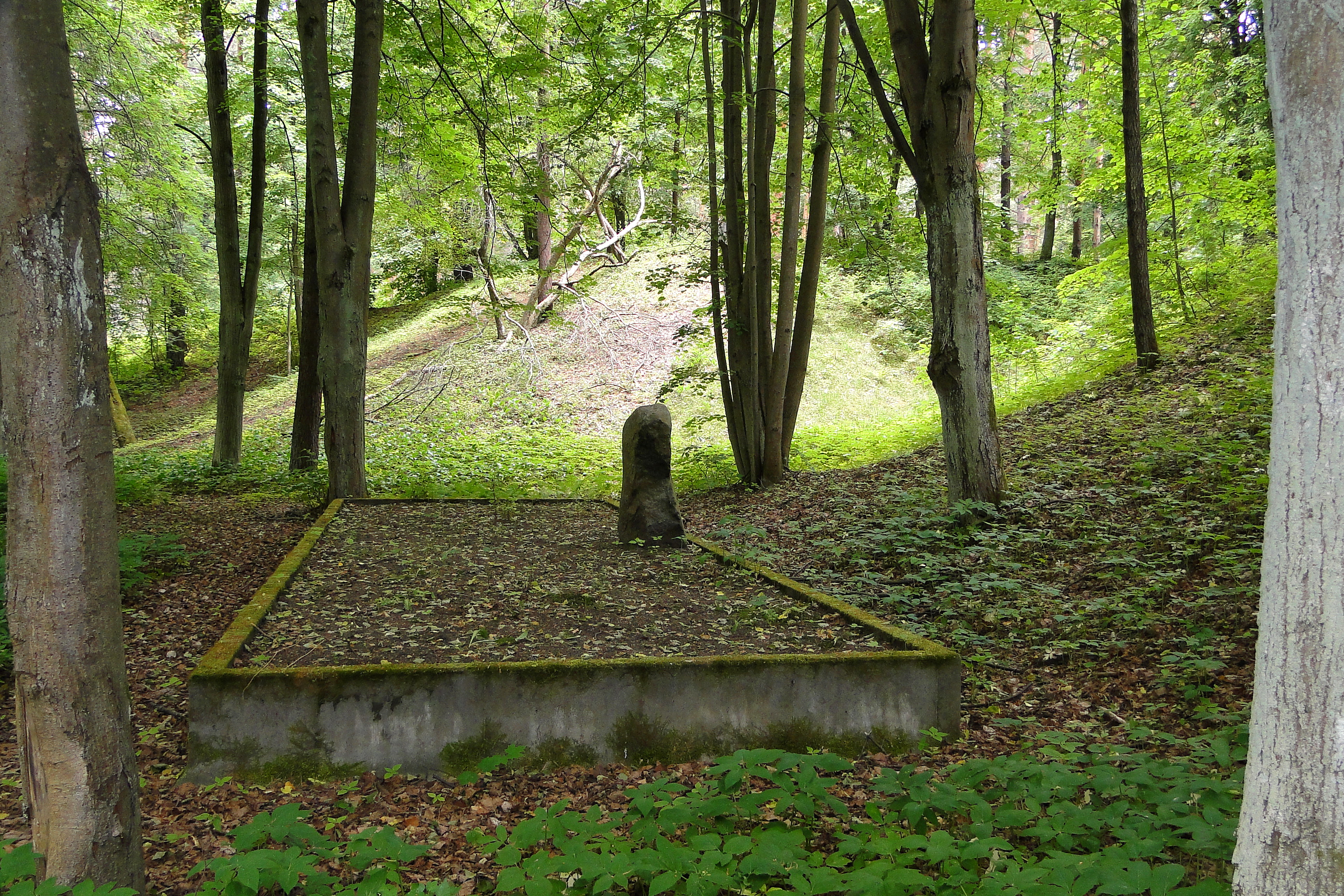
One of many gravesites in Bikernieki Forest

== See also ==
- List of cemeteries in Latvia
- Dünamünde Action
