= Jungfernhof concentration camp =

Coordinates: 56°53′32″N 24°11′53″E

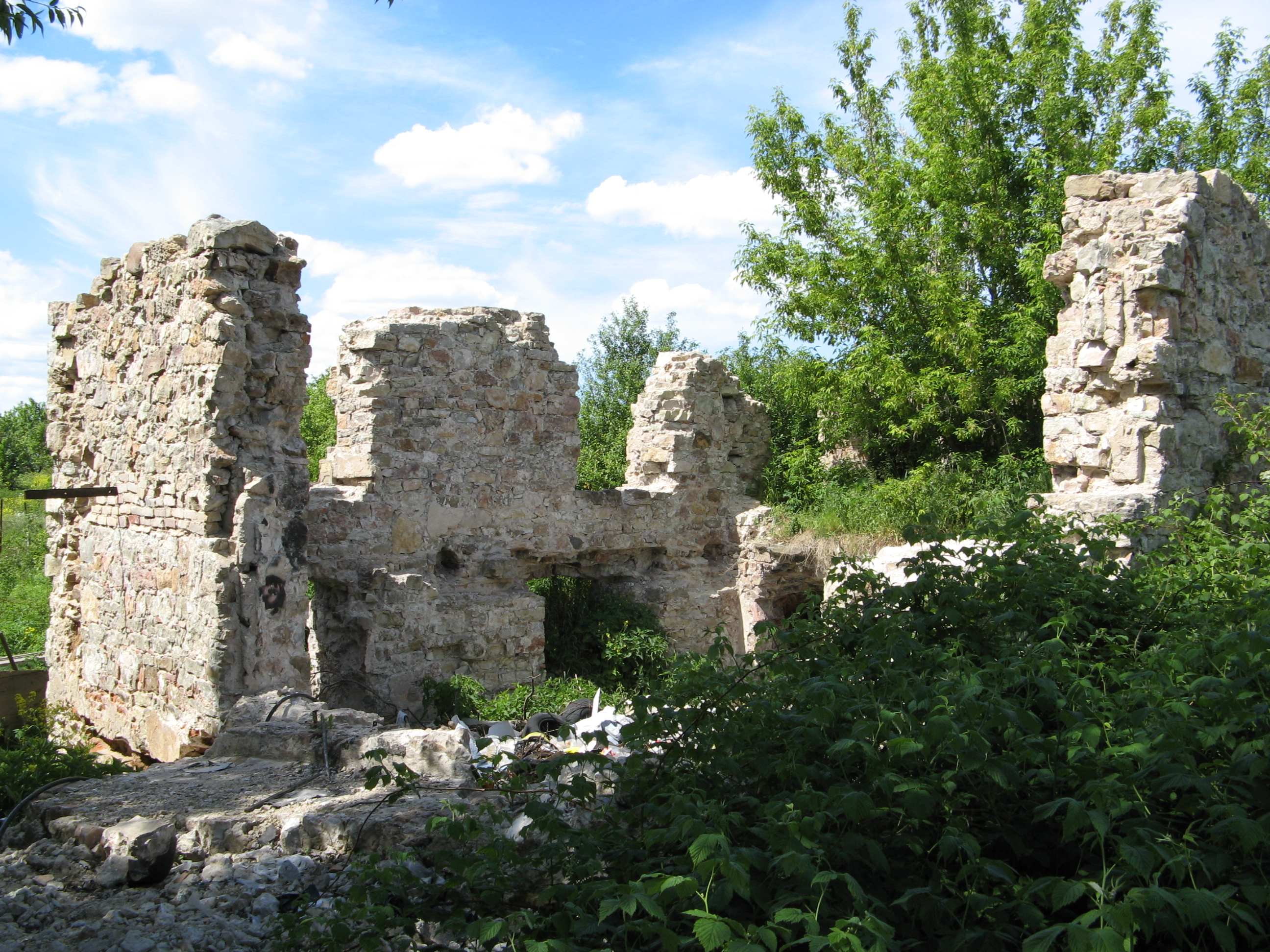
- Ruins of Jungfernhof in 2011
- Also known as: Mazjumprava; Jungfernhof
- Location: Riga, Latvia
- Date: December 1941–March 1942
- Incident type: Imprisonment without trial, mass shootings, forced labor, starvation
- Perpetrators: Franz Walter Stahlecker, Rudolf Seck
- Organizations: SS; Latvian Auxiliary Police
- Victims: 3,800–4,000
- Survivors: About 148 people
- Memorials: Bikernieki Memorial

The Jungfernhof concentration camp (Latvian: Jumpravmuižas koncentrācijas nometne) was a Nazi concentration camp located in Riga, Latvia from December 1941 to March 1942.

Jungfernhof was an improvised concentration camp near the Šķirotava Railway Station in southeast Riga to serve as overflow housing for Jews deported from Germany and Austria. Prisoners were used as forced labour to construct the nearby Salaspils concentration camp. Around 4,000 prisoners went through Jungfernhof during its four months of operation, with nearly all dying from the poor conditions at the camp or being killed in the Rumbula massacre and Dünamünde Action.

== Operations ==
By late 1941, the Riga Ghetto was overcrowded and could not accommodate the Jewish people being deported from Central Europe to the Baltic states. A rail transport of German Jews arrived unexpectedly in German-occupied Latvia when train had been rerouted to Riga from its original destination of Minsk. Nazi authorities intended to send these deportees to the nearby Salaspils concentration camp, but discovered that it was only in the early stages of construction. SS-Brigadeführer Franz Walter Stahlecker, commander of Einsatzgruppen A, sent the next four transports to Gut Jungfernhof (Mazjumprava in Latvian), an abandoned farming estate in the southeastern Latgale Suburb of Riga on the Daugava River. The first transport train with 1,053 Berlin Jews arrived at the nearby Šķirotava Railway Station on 30 November 1941. All persons on board were murdered later the same day at the Rumbula Forest near Riga. Jungfernhof was to have been established as an SS business enterprise, and being under the jurisdiction of the SS it could be employed without consulting with the Gebietskommissariat (German civil administration) in Latvia. Under the new plan, Jungfernhof would serve as improvised housing in order to make available labor for the construction of the Salaspils camp. The sixth transport, which arrived on 10 December 1941 with Cologne Jews on board, was the only one which came to the "freed up" Riga ghetto, following the murder there of numerous Latvian Jews.

The Jungfernhof estate was 200 hectares in size, with a warehouse, three large barns, five small barracks and various cattle sheds. The camp was quickly improvised: there were no watchtowers or an enclosed perimeter, rather a mobile patrol of ten to fifteen Latvian Auxiliary Police (Hilfspolizei) under the German commandant Rudolf Seck. The dilapidated and unheatable buildings were unsuitable for the accommodation of several thousand people.

In December 1941, a total of 3,984 people were brought in four separate trains to Jungfernhof, including 136 children under ten years old, and 766 elders. On 1 December, 1,013 Württemberg Jews were put on trains and sent to the camp. On 6 December, a further 964 were deported from cities of Hamburg and Lübeck (leaving only 90 Jews resident in the city), and the Schleswig-Holstein region. Further transports came with 1,008 people from Nuremberg and 1,001 from Vienna.

In March 1942, the Jungfernhof camp was dissolved and between 1,600 and 1,700 inmates were taken to Biķernieki forest as part of the Dünamünde Action, under the false representation that they would be taken to an (actually non-existing) camp in Daugavgrīva (Dünamünde), where there would be better conditions and work assignments in a canning plant. On 26 March 1942, they were shot in Biķernieki and interred in mass graves, as previously Jews from the Riga Ghetto had been. Among those shot was the camp elder Max Kleemann (b. 1887), a veteran of the Great War, who had been transported from Würzburg with his daughter Lore. Viktor Marx, from Württemberg, whose wife Marga and daughter Ruth were shot, reported:

In the camp it was said that all the women and children should come away from Jungfernhof and go to Dünamunde, where there would be hospitals, schools, and massive stone buildings where they could live. I asked the commandant if I too could be transferred to Dünamunde, but he refused me, because I was too good a worker.

== Victims ==
Around 4,000 prisoners, mostly Jews from Germany and Austria, went through the Jungfernhof camp durings the four months of operation, of whom only 148 persons survived. About 800 of the prisoners died in the winter of 1941 to 1942 of starvation, hypothermia, and typhus alone. The testimony of an eyewitness, that there was a gas van assigned to the camp, is no longer accepted and is treated as unsubstantiated.

Among the murdered inmates of the concentration camp were the older rabbis and prominent Jewish citizens of Lübeck, Felix F. Carlebach, his sister-in-law, Resi Carlebach (née Graupe), as well as his uncle, Joseph Carlebach (b. 1883) with his wife Charlotte (b. 1900 née Preuss), and their three youngest children, Ruth (b. 1926), Noemi (b. 1927) and Sara (b. 1928). They were shot in Biķernieki forest. The banker Simson Carlebach (1875-1942), brother of rabbi Joseph Carlebach, had already died in the course of being transported to the camp. The second oldest son of the nine children of Joseph Carlebach, Salomon (Shlomo Peter) Carlebach (b. 17 August 1925), survived because he had been included within a work commando. He later became a rabbi in New York. Salomon Carlebach reported in an interview on the moment that he saw his father for the last time:

I knew that my blessed father in this moment knew, that the last hour had come and that he would be going to a certain death, even though he had said nothing. Naturally many of the people shared the belief that now they really would be brought to another camp, where conditions would be much better.

On his personal story, Carlebach said "without a positive attitude no one had any chance of survival."

450 inmates were held back and formed into a work commando. They were intended to be used to disguise the camp remnants as a farm. This work commando existed for one year. The survivors were then sent to the Riga ghetto, which existed until November 1943.
