= Salaspils camp =

Nazi forced labour and concentration camp

Coordinates: 56°52′27.8″N 24°18′4.9″E

Salaspils concentration camp
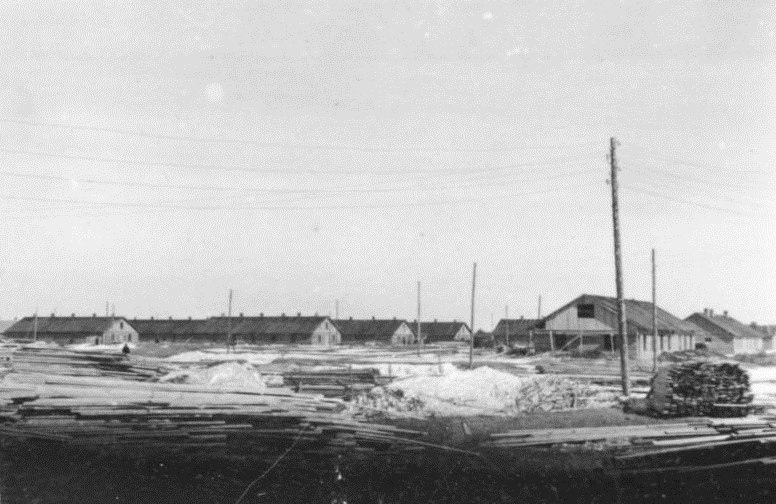
- Nazi propaganda photograph of Salaspils camp in 1941
- Also known as: Kurtenhof; Salaspils Police Prison and Re-Education Through Labor Camp
- Location: Salaspils, Latvia
- Date: 1941–1944
- Incident type: Imprisonment without trial, forced labor, starvation
- Perpetrators: Rudolf Lange, Otto Teckemeier
- Organizations: SS; Latvian Auxiliary Police
- Victims: 2,000–3,000
- Memorials: At site

The Salaspils concentration camp (Latvian: Salaspils koncentrācijas nometne; German: Lager Kurtenhof) was a Nazi concentration camp located near Salaspils, Latvia from 1941 to 1944. It was the largest civilian concentration camp in the Baltic states during World War II.

Salaspils camp was established by Rudolf Lange as a prison camp for the Sicherheitspolizei but it soon developed into a de facto concentration camp operated by the Schutzstaffel (SS). Its prisoner population was variable, including Jews deported from Central Europe, political prisoners, Latvian anti-Nazi partisans, and Latvian pro-Nazi collaborators. An estimated 2,000 to 3,000 people died at Salaspils due to the deplorable living conditions, and the camp has had a lasting legacy in Latvian and Russian culture due to the severity of the treatment, especially with regard to child prisoners. Memorials to the victims were erected in 1967 and 2004.

== Original plan ==
In December 1941, SS-Sturmbannführer Rudolf Lange was appointed commander of both the Sicherheitspolizei (SiPo) and Sicherheitsdienst (SD) in German-occupied Latvia, officially known as Generalbezirk Lettland in Reichskommissariat Ostland. Lange was also appointed detachment commander of Einsatzkommando 2 (EK2), a mobile death squad of the Special Assignment Group A (Einsatzgruppe A) attached to Army Group North. Since October, Lange had already begun planning an internment camp to be built at Salaspils (18 km (11 mi) southeast of Riga) to confine people arrested in Latvia by the police, and also to house Jewish people being deported east from Germany, Austria and Czechoslovakia. The site near the town of Salaspils was chosen as it was readily accessible from the main railway connecting Riga and Daugavpils, the two largest cities in Latvia. The plan was to work the prisoners harvesting peat and, as part of what soon became known as the Final Solution, to separate Jewish men from Jewish women to prevent them from having children. In February 1942, Lange was a participant in the Wannsee Conference where the final plans for the extermination of Jews in Europe were established by the Nazi leadership.

The Salaspils camp was officially branded as a "Kurtenhof Police Prison and Re-Education Through Labor Camp" (Kurtenhof Polizeigefängnis und Arbeitserziehungslager), though it became comparable to a typical Nazi concentration camp in the way the work was organized, the types of prisoners, as well as their treatment, as they recounted later. The 30-hectare site was surrounded by a double barbed wire fence with guard towers at the corners, which were equipped with searchlights and machine guns. The camp consisted of at least 59 structures, which included barracks, workshops and auxiliary buildings. From December 1941 to the end of 1943, the Salaspils camp was guarded by 189 men of the Arajs Kommando team under the command of Konrāds Kalējs. The camp was then guarded by soldiers of the Latvian Auxiliary Police until the summer of 1944, when it was guarded by men of the Lithuanian SD. Prisoners were housed in separate barracks according to nationality, gender and type of detention.

== History ==
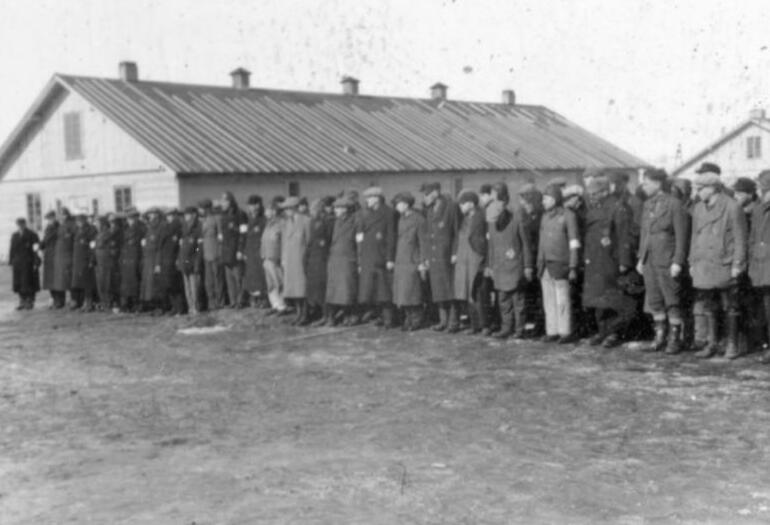
Nazi propaganda photo of a prisoner roll call at Salaspils, December 22, 1941

In October 1941, the first rail transport of German Jews arrived unexpectedly in Latvia, before the Salaspils camp was constructed. The train had been rerouted to Riga from its original destination of Minsk. The Jewish people on the train were housed temporarily in Jungfernhof concentration camp and in a Nazi-delineated part of Riga, which later became known as the Riga Ghetto. The Nazis had planned to deport the last remaining Jews from Germany by the end of the summer of 1942. To support this, the plans for the Salaspils camp were revised in an effort to allow the camp to accommodate 15,000 Jews deported from Germany. The camp was to play three roles: a general police prison, a concentration camp, and a forced labor camp. Salaspils was constructed quickly by Soviet prisoners of war from a nearby Wehrmacht camp, deported Czech Jews, as well as a few German Jews from Jungfernhof. In the middle of January 1942, at least 1,000 Jews from the Riga Ghetto were forced to work building the camp. By the autumn of 1942, out of the 45 barracks housing 15,000 prisoners that were planned, the Salaspils camp comprised only 15 barracks housing 1,800 prisoners.

In October 1942, SS chief Heinrich Himmler ordered that Latvian, Estonian and Lithuanian police battalion soldiers convicted by SS and police courts should serve their sentences at the camp. By the end of 1942, Salaspils held mainly political prisoners, including those who had originally been incarcerated at the Riga central prison without due process under "protective custody orders", interned foreigners such as Latvian returnees from Soviet Russia whom the Nazis considered politically suspect, and Latvian collaborators who had committed routine crimes without permission. There were only 12 Jews in the camp left, as many had died or been returned to Riga in a weak condition. Himmler briefly considered converting the camp into an official concentration camp (Konzentrationslager), which would have formally subordinated the camp to the National Security Main Office, but nothing came of this.

By March 1943, around 1,100 children were imprisoned at Salaspils, most of whom were from the families of anti-Nazi partisans and their supporters. The children's camp was liquidated in May, with the surviving children being dispersed to orphanages or farms in the surrounding area.

By 1944, Salapils was mainly populated by members of the Latvian resistance, various conscientious objectors and draft evaders, and deserters from the Latvian Legion.

== Activity ==
Prisoners at Salaspils were forced to participate in labour-intensive work for 10 hours per day, six days a week, at various work sites in and around the camp. Those who broke the camp rules were punished by being beaten with batons or sent to a "punishment group". They were forced to live in a separate barracks, work for 14 hours per day, and perform the dirtiest and hardest work. Political prisoners, except for those in the punishment group, could send letters and receive outside gifts such as food, clothes, books twice per month.

== Numbers of victims ==
Around 12,000 prisoners went through Salaspils during its existence, of which about 2,000 to 3,000 people died due to insufficient accommodation, poor sanitary conditions, lack of nutrition, and severe cold weather. About half of the children at the camp died from typhoid fever, measles and other diseases. In one of the burial places by the camp, 632 corpses of children of ages 5 to 9 were revealed. The deplorable living and working conditions at the camp resulted in the extraordinarily high number of deaths among the prisoners.

After Latvia was occupied by the Soviet Union, claims were made by Soviet historians that over 100,000 people were killed at Salaspils during the German occupation. These figures are nowadays classified as propaganda.

== Later history ==
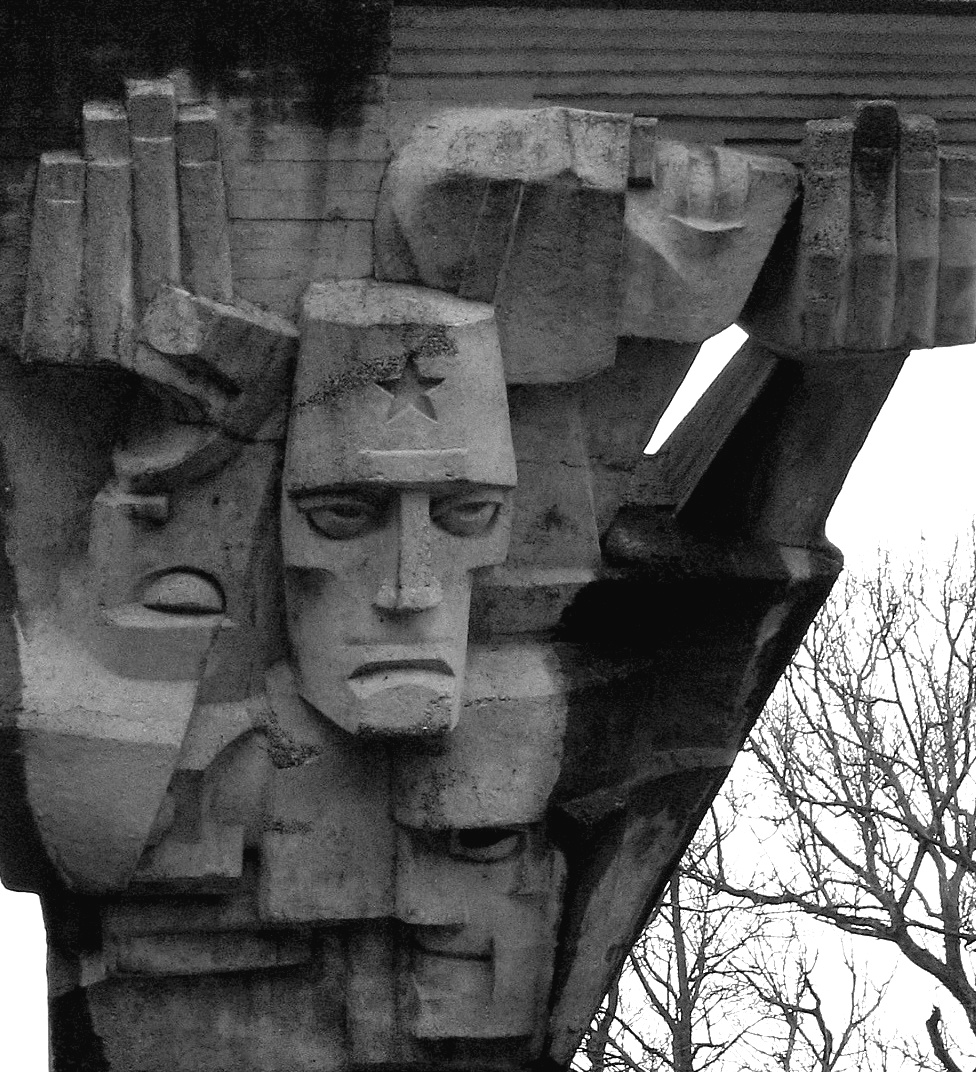
Salaspils memorial faces

Salaspils was liquidated in the autumn of 1944 in anticipation of the advancing Red Army, and most remaining prisoners at the camp were dispersed to other camps or sent to penal battalions. The Soviets used the remaining barracks at the camp to house German prisoners of war.

Starting in 1949, legal proceedings were brought against some of the persons responsible for the Nazi crimes in Latvia, including the Riga Ghetto, and the Jungfernhof and Salaspils concentration camps. Some accused were condemned to life imprisonment. One of the accused, Gerhard Kurt Maywald, was convicted of crimes committed in the camp.

=== Memorial of the Salaspils police prison ===
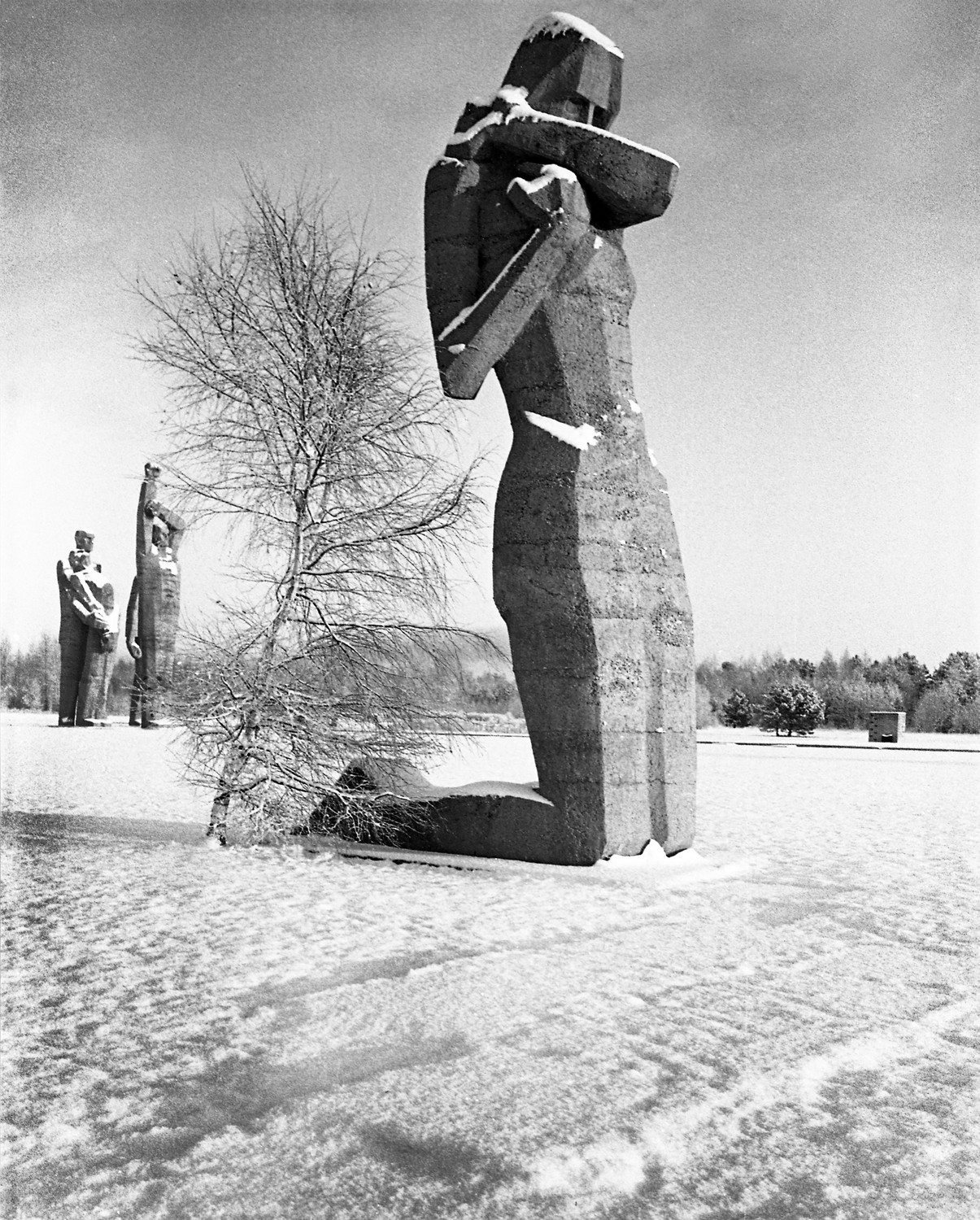
Monumental sculptures at the memorial (1975)

In 1967, a Memorial of the Salaspils Police Prison was established in Salaspils, at the time part of the Latvian SSR. The memorial included an exhibit room, several sculptures and a large marble block by architects Gunārs Asaris, Ivars Strautmanis, Oļģerts Ostenbergs, in 2004, thanks to a donation by Larry Pik, a former prisoner at the Salaspils concentration camp, a separate monument to commemorate foreign Jews who died there was erected. The monument bears the Star of David and an inscription in Hebrew, Latvian and German: “To honour the dead and as a warning to the living. In memory of the Jews deported from Germany, Austria and Czechia, who from December 1941 to June 1942 died from hunger, cold and inhumanity and have found eternal rest in the Salaspils forest”.

During the time of the Soviet Union, the Russian group "Singing Guitars" (Russian: Поющие гитары) dedicated a song "Salaspils" to the children's camp.

== See also ==
- The Holocaust in Latvia
- Nazi concentration camps
