= German anti-partisan operations in World War II =

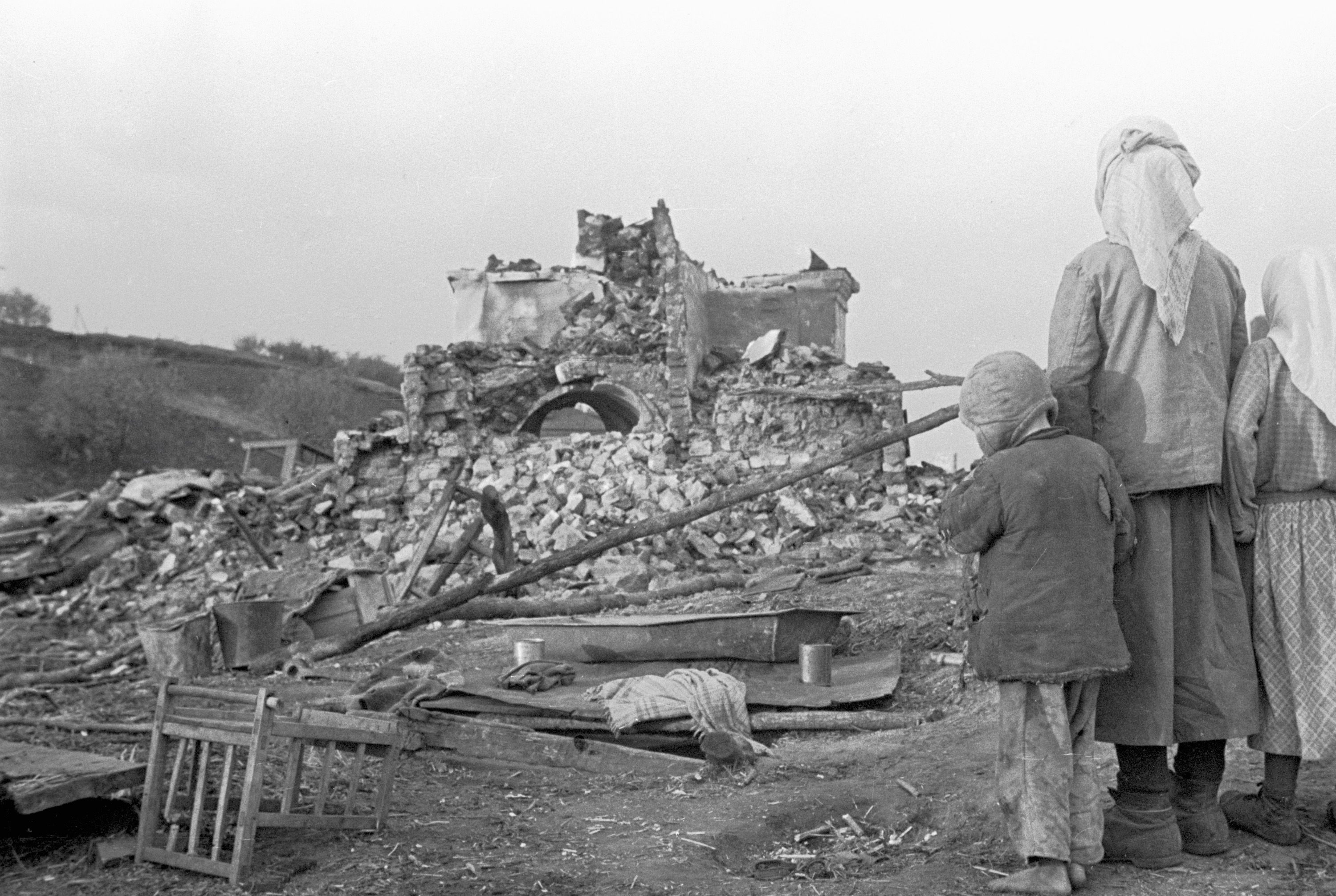
Belarusian family and the ruins of their village, 1944

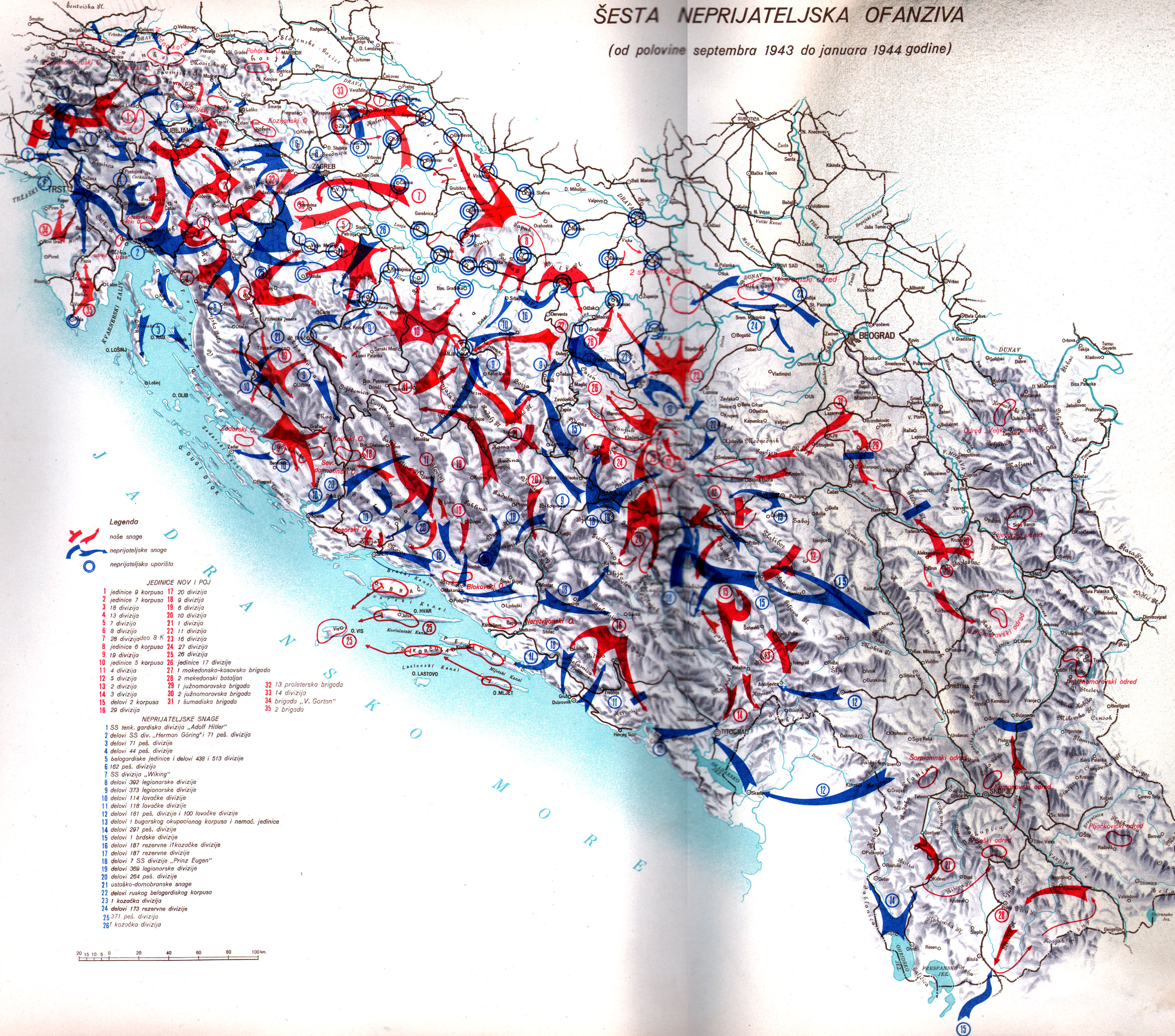
Map of Operation Kugelblitz, an anti-partisan offensive in occupied Yugoslavia

During the Second World War, resistance movements that bore any resemblance to irregular warfare were frequently dealt with by the German occupying forces under the auspices of anti-partisan warfare. In many cases, the Nazis euphemistically used the term "anti-partisan operations" to obfuscate ethnic cleansing and ideological warfare operations against perceived enemies; this included Jews, Communist officials (so-called Jewish Bolsheviks), Red Army stragglers, and others. This was especially the case on the Eastern Front, where anti-partisan operations often resulted in the massacres of innocent civilians. While the worst atrocities in terms of scale occurred in the Eastern theater of the war, the Nazis employed "anti-partisan" tactics in Western Europe as well.

Historian Alex J. Kay estimates that around one million civilians may have died as a result of German anti-partisan warfare—excluding actual partisans—among the 13 to 14 million people murdered by the Nazis during World War II.

A. Dirk Moses notes that the German security warfare was an extreme version of strategies and tactics pursued by other colonial powers against anti-colonial resistance. "All resistance was regarded as illegitimate, and civilians were targeted preemptively and often collectively to forestall future resistance", while the laws of war were suspended on the basis that the enemy was barbarian.

== Origins and military doctrine ==
The forms of resistance varied depending on place and time, and so did the Germans' countermeasures. Both the scale of resistance and the severity of German reprisals were much more limited in the West than in the East. While Germans were much more likely to treat the entire local populace as enemies in the East, they were much less ideologically driven in the West, where, for example, women and children were only rarely killed by SS troops, but were a much more common target in the East. Some scholars have noted that in the East, the anti-partisan operations gave Germans a pretext for ideologically motivated ethnic cleansing.

In the context of the German campaign against so-called "partisans" in the occupied territories, SS Chief Heinrich Himmler framed security operations as a struggle for the survival of the Reich. He cast local resistance not as legitimate military opposition but as a form of criminality threatening the German people, thereby justifying draconian measure. As he explained in December 1941:

The task entrusted to us is to guarantee security, law and order... This task demands of us that we eliminate ruthlessly every center of resistance and impose in the most drastic way the just death penalty upon the enemies of the German people.

The Germans concentrated on short-term victories against the partisans and were able, in some cases, to defeat the partisans militarily, but overall their atrocities against civilians in the East resulted in a continuous flow of volunteers joining the partisan ranks. The first resistance movements were created as early as late 1939 in occupied Poland (see the Separated Unit of the Polish Army). As the war progressed and the number of Nazi-occupied territories grew, so did the number and strength of resistance movements.

Throughout the war, regular formations of German army, auxiliary police formations (Ordnungspolizei) and their helpers (Schutzmannschaft or Hilfspolizei) participated in anti-partisan operations. The struggle of Germans versus the partisans can be described as a stalemate, eventually ended by the German military defeat in the regular war. After the war, brutal German tactics used against the partisans were one of the charges presented at the Nuremberg Trials (see legality of the Commando Order and Hostages Trial).

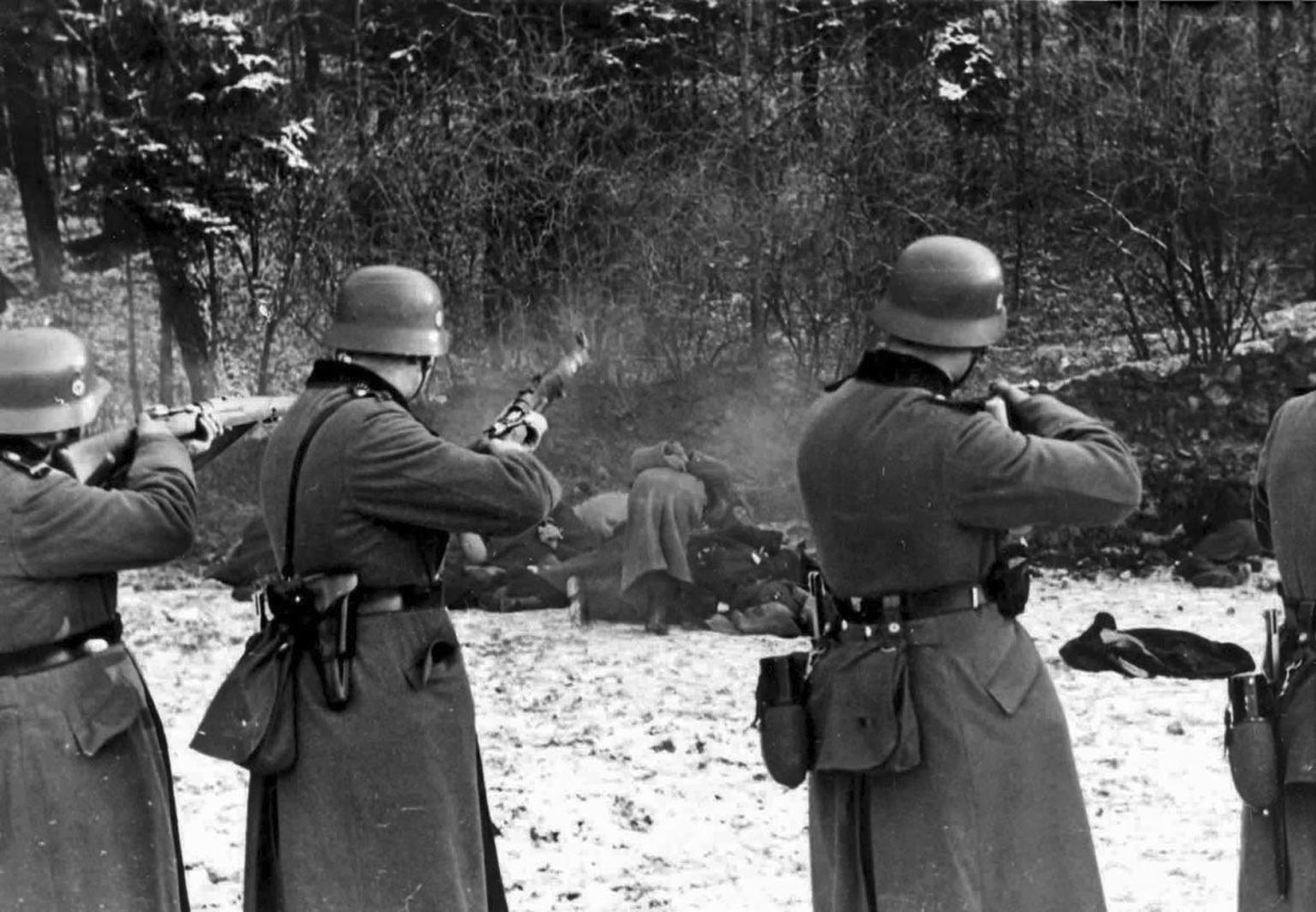
The execution of 56 Polish citizens in Bochnia, near Kraków, during the German occupation of Poland, December 18, 1939, in reprisal for an attack on a German police office two days earlier by the underground organization "White Eagle"

== Operations by country and territory ==
=== German-occupied Poland ===
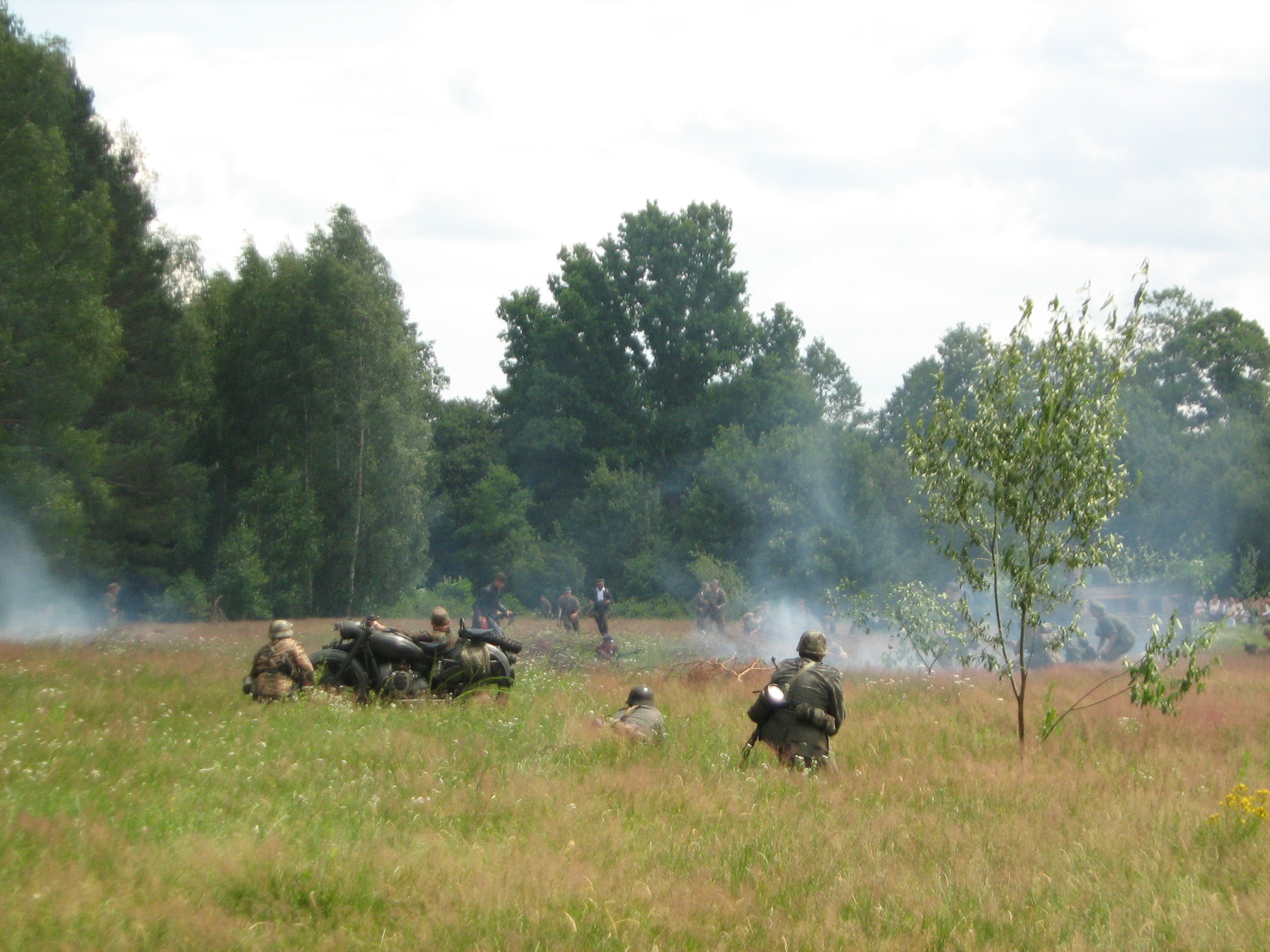
Historical recreation of battle of Osuchy (one of the largest battles of the Polish partisans); summer 2007

The Polish resistance movement was formed soon after the German invasion of Poland in September 1939 and quickly grew in response to the brutal methods of the German occupation. Polish resistance had operatives in the urban areas, as well as in the forests (leśni). Throughout the war, the Polish resistance grew in numbers, and increased the scale of its operations, requiring the Germans to devote an increasing amount of resources (personnel, equipment and time) to deal with the partisan threat.

Polish partisans were particularly active in the Zamość region (see the Zamość Uprising). Sturmwind I and Sturmwind II ("Hurricane") in June 1944 were the largest German operations against the Polish leśni partisans, based on the "cauldron operations" Germans developed to deal with the Soviet partisans (see also battle of Osuchy). German losses in those operations amounted to about 1,300 fatalities and similar number of wounded; partisan losses were similar. Soon afterward, the Polish resistance launched a series of major operations against the Germans (Operation Tempest), of which the Warsaw Uprising was the best known. In Operation Tempest, Polish partisans challenged the Germans in a series of open battles for the control of vital strategic areas. The Germans were not prepared for the vast scale of the Polish operation, but had the advantage of numbers and better equipment; further, when the Polish partisans had to operate without the support of the advancing Red Army, they were significantly less effective. In areas where the Soviets cooperated with the Poles, the Germans were much less able to suppress the partisans, but where the Soviets did not advance to aid the Poles, as was the case with the Warsaw Uprising, the Germans were able to concentrate enough regular army and anti-partisan units to defeat the Polish insurgents.

The tactics and policies the Germans developed in Poland served as a template for similar operations against the Soviet partisans.

=== German-occupied areas of the Soviet Union ===
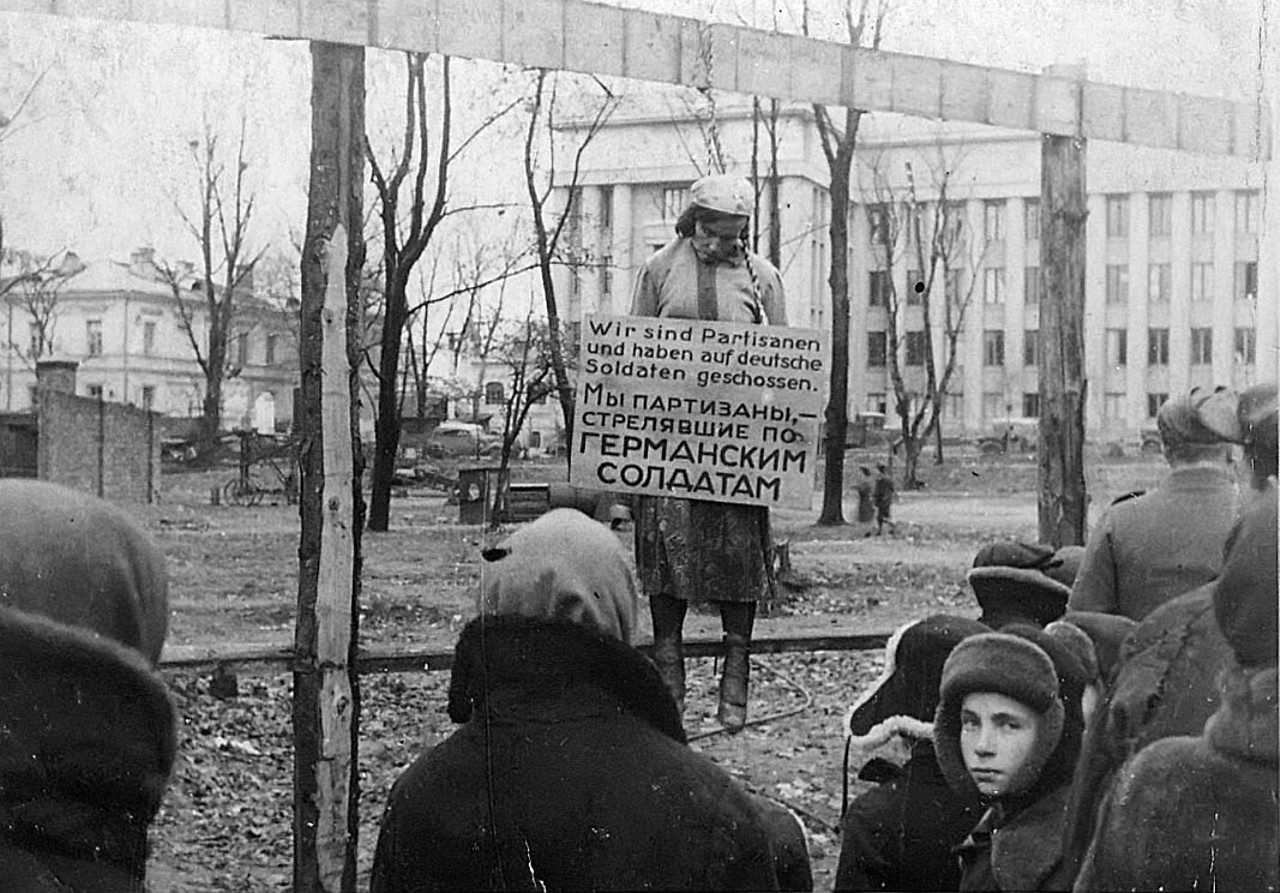
Hospital nurse Olga Shcherbatsevich, who treated captured Red Army soldiers, publicly hanged in Minsk on 26 October 1941

In early 1941 Germans set up special units – Wehrmacht Security Divisions – to deal with securing the rear and carrying out anti-partisan duties. These formations were also involved in the repression of civilians, including participation in The Holocaust by rounding up Jews.

The policies the Germans employed in the occupied Soviet territories were the extension of the brutal policies they had developed over the previous two years in occupied Poland. At first, the Germans tried to cow the local populace with violence. The policies of 1941 were aimed more at a potential threat than a real one, as the Soviet partisans were only just organizing in the aftermath of the German invasion. It was on the Eastern Front (including the Balkans) that there was the greatest German terror against the local populace. To a certain degree, it is hard to distinguish pure military anti-partisan operations from ethnic cleansing actions.

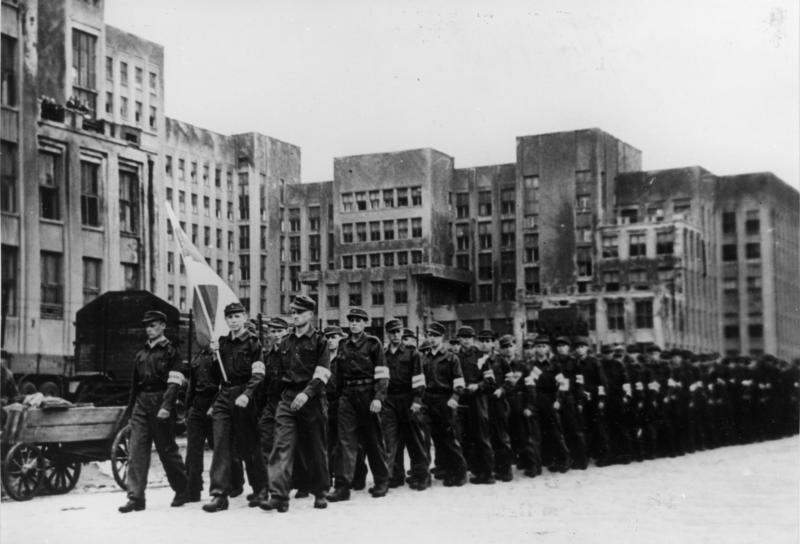
On the way to the railway station in Minsk young people from Belarus march past the chairman of the Belarusian Central Council, Professor Radasłaŭ Astroŭski. They are going to be trained in Germany for military action, Minsk, June 1944.

With the German failure to topple the Soviet Union in the first year of the war, the anti-partisan policy changed, switching from short-term to a more long-term view. Nazi propaganda and similar tactics were employed in order to influence the local populace and make them more friendly towards the Germans (and less towards the partisans). It was at this time that Germans started to support the creation of local auxiliary units to be used against the partisans. The anti-partisan operations also became more professional and better organized.

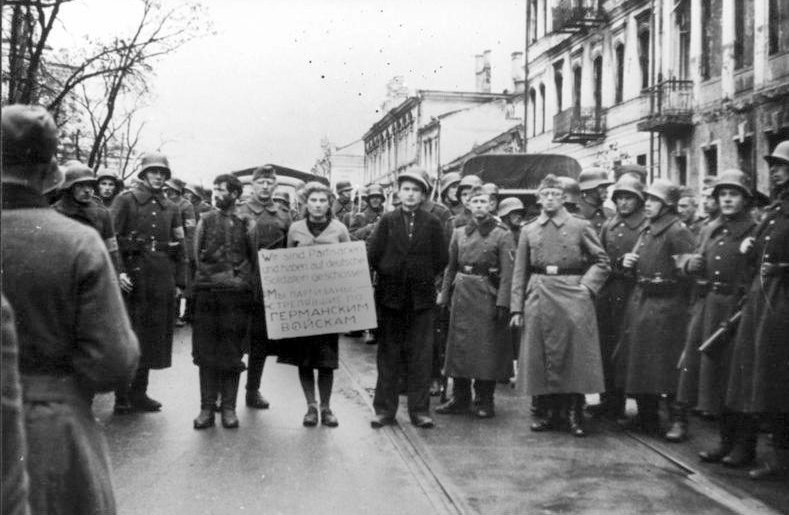
Civilians in Minsk, Byelorussia forced to wear a placard reading "We are Partisans and Have Shot at German Soldiers" before their executions in October 1941

By late 1942, the "hearts and minds" policy had already weakened. Around 1942–1943, large-scale "encirclement operations" were employed, which involved the use of regular army units, detached from the frontline, against the partisans. Such operations often involved the destruction of villages that were seen as potentially supporting the partisans; that meant both the physical destruction of the buildings and the massacres of local inhabitants. These "encirclement operations" antagonized the local populace, contributing to the growth, not shrinking, of the Soviet partisans' ranks. Major "encirclement operations" included Operation München and Operation Bamberg (March–April 1942), Operation Hannover (May–June 1942), Operation Vogelsang (June–July 1942) and Operation Zigeunerbaron ("Gypsy Baron", May–June 1943).

In 1944, a new policy was introduced: the creation of Wehrdoerfer, or fortified villages. This project, seen by Germans as one of the most successful German anti-partisan policies (and later imitated by other armies, for example, the French in Algeria or the United States in Vietnam), involved the creation of autonomous and well-armed villages, in collaboration with local Nazi sympathizers. The advance of the Red Army and liberation of the remaining Soviet territories from under the German occupation prevented the full implementation of this policy.

=== German-occupied Italy ===
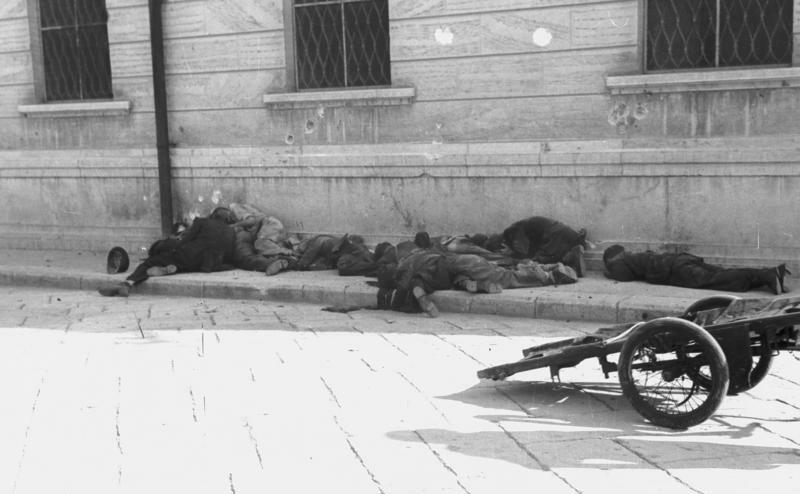
Italian civilians shot by invading Germans in Barletta, September 12, 1943

Casualties in Italy among the Italian Resistance Movement include 35,828 partisans killed in action or executed, and 21,168 partisans mutilated or left disabled by their wounds. Another 32,000 Italian partisans were killed abroad (in the Balkans and, to a lesser extent, in France). According to other estimates, the Italian resistance lost some 50,000 fighters throughout the conflict. Thousands to tens of thousands of Italian civilians were killed in reprisals by the German and Italian Fascist forces.

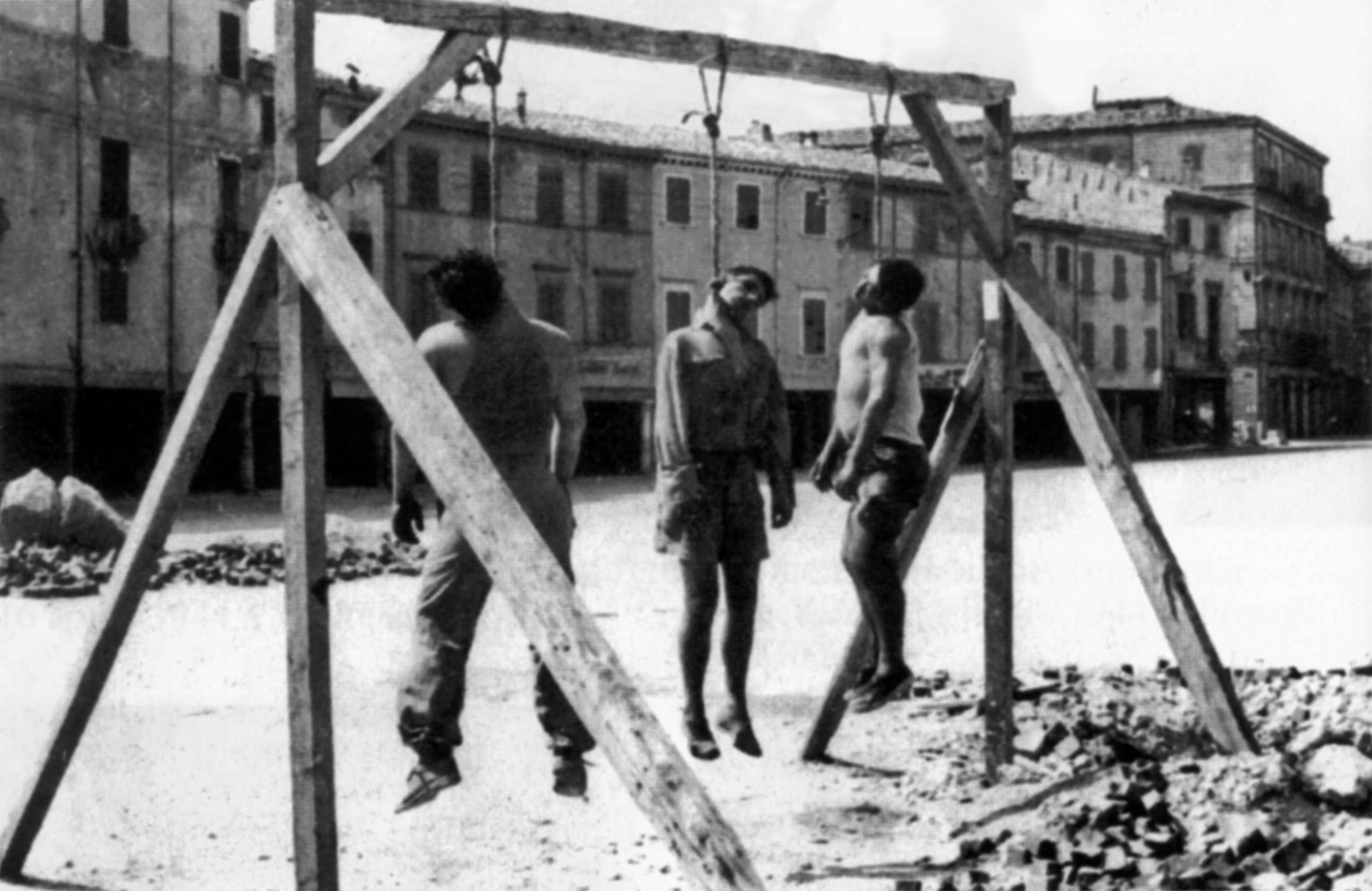
Three Italian partisans executed by public hanging in Rimini, August 1944

Armed resistance to the German occupation following the armistice between Italy and Allied armed forces at first included mainly the Italian regular forces, such as the Italian Armed Forces and the Carabinieri military police. Later, the Comitato di Liberazione Nazionale (Committee of National Liberation, or CLN), created by the Italian Communist Party, the Italian Socialist Party, the Partito d'Azione (a republican liberal socialist party), Democrazia Cristiana and other minor parties, took control of the movement.

In their attempts to suppress the Resistance, German and Italian Fascist forces (especially the SS, Gestapo, and paramilitary militias such as Xª MAS and Black Brigades) committed war crimes, including summary executions and systematic reprisals against the civilian population. Resistance captives and suspects, as well as random local Italian civilians, were often tortured and raped. Italian partisans, especially those in the mountainous and rural regions, relied heavily on the local populace for support and supplies. The Nazis tried to punish the populace and discourage civilian support for the Resistance by adopting a reprisal policy of killing 10 Italians for every German killed by the partisans. Those executed would usually come from the village near where a partisan attack against Nazis took place and sometimes included captive partisan fighters themselves.

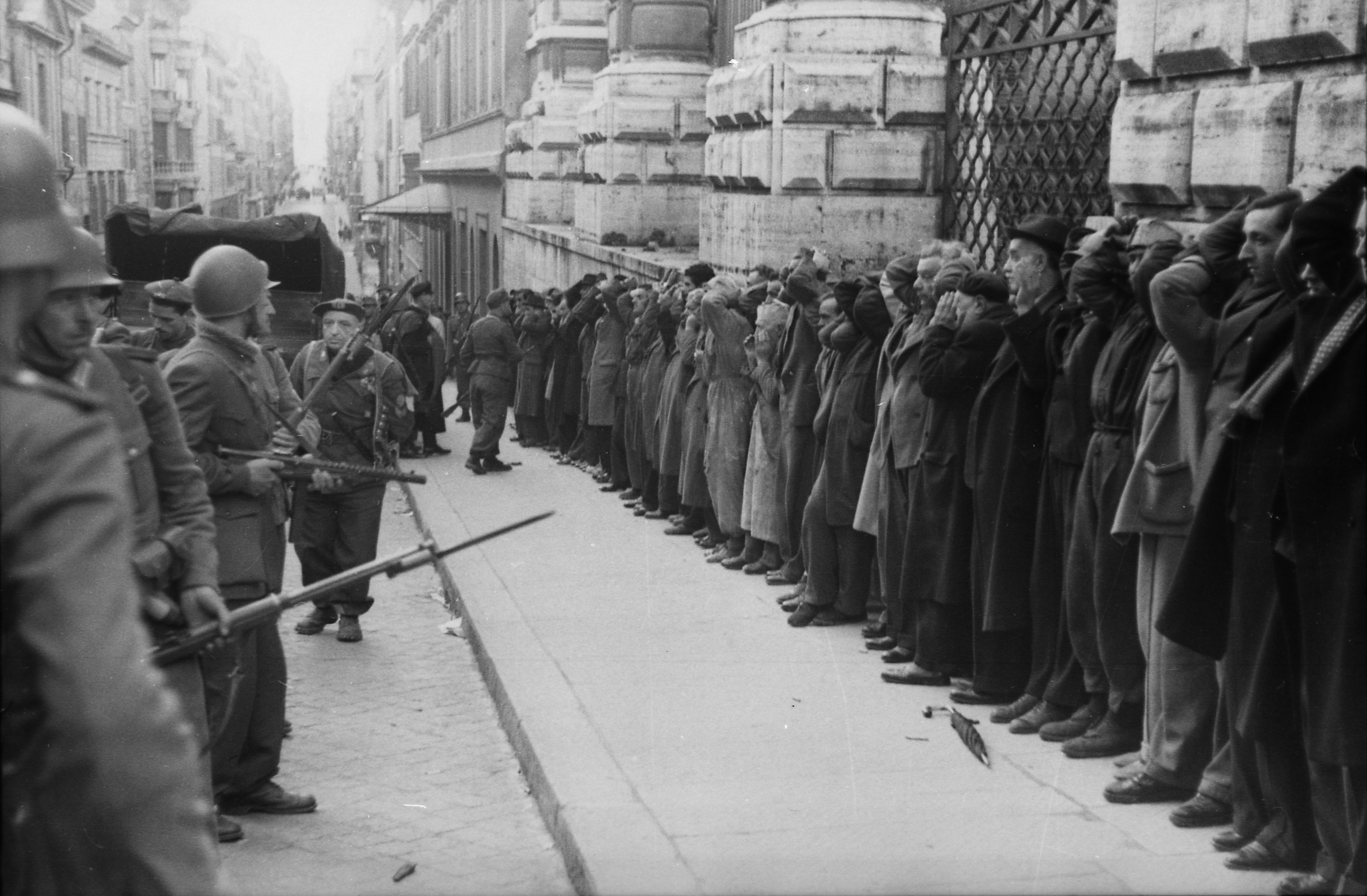
German troops and Italian collaborators round-up Italian civilians after the Via Rasella attack in Rome on 23 March 1944, shortly before the Ardeatine massacre

Some of the most notorious mass atrocities included the Ardeatine massacre (335 Italian Jewish civilians and Italian political prisoners executed in a reprisal operation the day after the Via Rasella attack in Rome), the Sant'Anna di Stazzema massacre (about 560 random Italian villagers brutally killed in an anti-partisan operation in the central mountains), the Marzabotto massacre (about 770 Italian civilians killed in similar circumstances) and the Salussola massacre (20 Italian partisan murdered after being tortured). In all, an estimated 15,000 Italian civilians were deliberately killed, including many women and children.

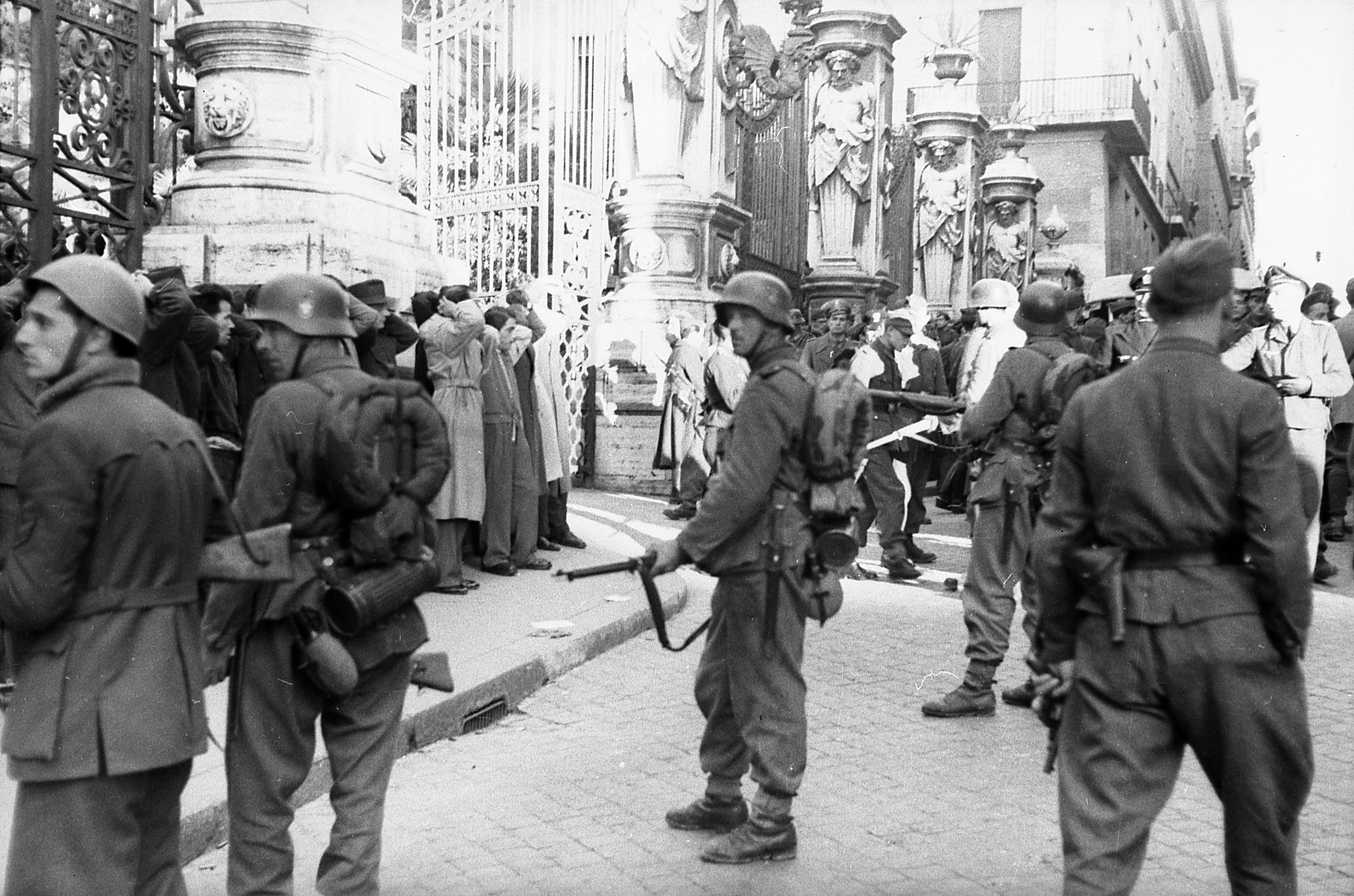
German troops round up Italian civilians in front of the Palazzo Barberini, Rome, in March 1944, shortly before the Ardeatine massacre

In addition, following the Italian armistice, the Germans collectively rounded up and interned Italian soldiers, even those not actively involved in the Resistance. Italian soldiers captured by the Germans numbered around 650,000-700,000 (some 45,000 others were killed in combat, executed, or died during transport), of whom between 40,000 and 50,000 later died in the camps. After disarmament by the Germans, the Italian soldiers and officers were confronted with the choice to continue fighting as allies of the Nazi German army (either in the armed forces of the Italian Social Republic, the German puppet regime in northern Italy, or in Italian "volunteer" units in the German armed forces) or, otherwise, be sent to detention camps in Germany. Only 10 percent agreed to cooperate with the Third Reich, with the remainder refusing to enroll or continue fighting for Germany and were instead interned under terrible conditions. The Nazis designated the interned Italian soldiers as Italienische Militär-Internierte ("Italian military internees") to deny them prisoner of war status and the rights granted by the Geneva Convention. The actions of the Italian soldiers who refused to further cooperate with the Nazis were eventually recognized as an act of unarmed resistance.

=== Axis-occupied Yugoslavia ===
After the Axis invasion of Yugoslavia, the Yugoslav resistance forces consisted of the Partisans. The Partisans were a communist-led movement propagating pan-Yugoslav tolerance ("brotherhood and unity") and incorporating republican, left-wing, and liberal elements of Yugoslav politics. The Partisans organized after the Axis invasion of the Soviet Union and were initially supported by the Soviets. The Partisans received universal Allied recognition in place of the Chetniks after the Tehran Conference in 1943. By the time of this conference, the degree of Chetnik-Axis collaboration was indicated to have increased greatly.

During the war, the Axis forces mounted a number of operations against the partisans. Former Yugoslav historiography recognized seven major offensives, of which the fourth and the fifth came close to defeating the partisan forces, and the seventh almost captured their headquarters.

=== German-occupied France ===
In France, as in the rest of occupied Western Europe, Germans used different, milder policies than in the East. Part of the reason for this was that the scale of resistance facing German authorities was much smaller. A large part of France remained under autonomous Vichy regime. Hence from the very beginning of the occupation, much of the police duties were carried out by local (French) forces.

Around 1943, as the French Resistance grew in size (due to the Vichy regime accepting the deportation of Frenchmen for forced labor in Germany), German anti-partisan operations in France became more serious. The Germans deployed military units against the resistance groups, and managed to create a large and successful counter-network of covert collaborators, which succeeded in infiltrating many cells of the French Resistance. The first major German military operation against the French Resistance took place in early 1944 in the mountainous region of the French Alps and French Jura. The French resistance forces went to ground and reorganized soon after the German operation ended. Soon afterward, another operation where the French Resistance challenged the Germans to a battle at Plateau de Glieres in Savoy ended in a German victory. Despite this defeat and London's advice to avoid head-on confrontation, in the aftermath of the Allied invasion of France (D-Day) the French Resistance openly challenged German forces in several areas. After several early Resistance successes, German countermeasures became particularly harsh. Once seriously threatened, German forces resorted to brutality and terror that had been mostly unheard of previously on the Western front (but commonplace on the Eastern). The largest atrocity occurred in Oradour-sur-Glane, where the Germans massacred 642 local inhabitants and burned the village. German terror tactics proved successful in the short term, as the shocked Resistance pulled back.

Around July and August, Germans launched their largest operations against the Maquis du Vercors. Similar to the "cauldron operations" employed in the Soviet Union, 10,000 German troops encircled and destroyed a 4,000-strong local partisan force, also committing atrocities against the local civilian population, in order to terrorize the locals and to prevent the surviving partisans from regrouping in the villages.

== List of anti-partisan operations ==
=== France ===
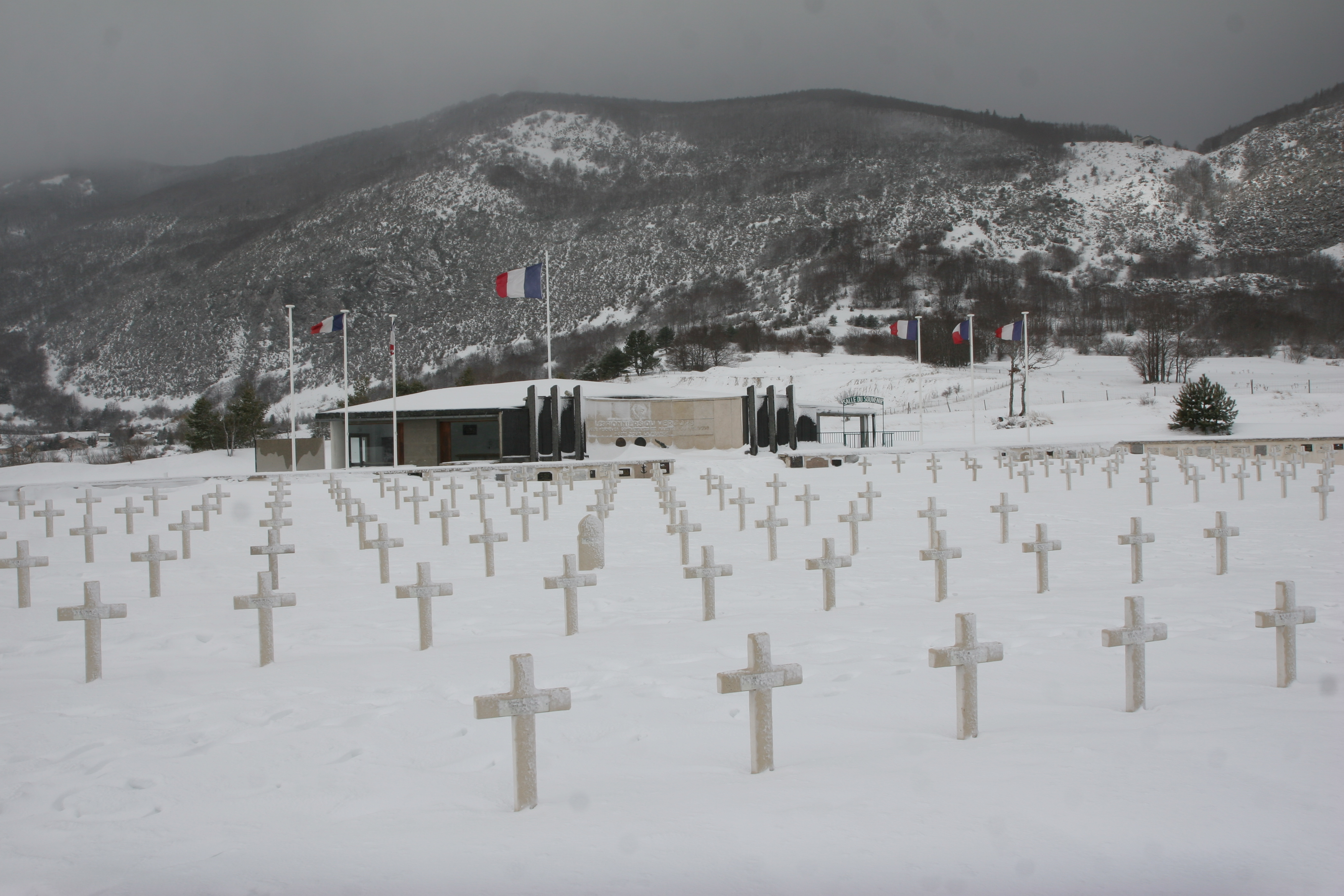
Cemetery and memorial in Vassieux-en-Vercors, where German forces, composed of Russians and Ukrainians, killed partisans and inhabitants

- Fruhling and Vercors (January 1944 – July 1944) (Nazi Germany) — action to suppress FFI activity in Vercors Massif, France followed by main German action to retake Vercors Massif, France

=== Poland ===
- Sturmwind I and Sturmwind II ("Hurricane") (June 1944) (Nazi Germany) — largest anti-partisan action in Poland (see Battle of Osuchy)

=== Soviet Union ===
- Spadshchansky Forest (October 19 – November, 1941) (Nazi Germany) anti-partisan operations in Ukraine: Spadshchansky Forest, near Putyvl
- Hornung (March–April 1942) (Nazi Germany) — anti-partisan operation in the Soviet Union
- Bamberg (March 26 – April 6, 1942) (Nazi Germany) — anti-partisan operation in Belarus: Hłusk, Bobrujsk
- Operation ? (May 9 – 12, 1942) (Nazi Germany) — anti-partisan operation in Belarus: Kliczów, Bobrujsk
- Hannover (May–June 1942) (Nazi Germany) — anti-partisan operation in the Soviet Union
- Operation ? (beginning of June 1942) (Nazi Germany) — anti-partisan operation in Belarus: Słowodka, Bobrujsk
- Operation ? (June 15, 1942) (Nazi Germany) — anti-partisan operation in Belarus: Borki, Białystok County
- Operation ? (June 21, 1942) (Nazi Germany) — anti-partisan operation in Belarus: Zbyszin
- Operation ? (June 25, 1942) (Nazi Germany) — anti-partisan operation in Belarus: Timkowczi
- Operation ? (June 26, 1942) (Nazi Germany) — anti-partisan operation in Belarus: Studenka
- Vogelsang (June–July 1942) (Nazi Germany) — anti-partisan operation in the Soviet Union
- Adler (July 15 – August 7, 1942) (Nazi Germany) Anti-partisan operation centered on the Chechivichi region of Belarus: Bobrujsk, Mohylew, Berezyna
- Operation ? (July 18, 1942) (Nazi Germany) — anti-partisan operation in Belarus: Jelsk
- Greif (August 14–20, 1942) (Nazi Germany) — anti-partisan operation in Belarus: Orsza, Witebsk
- Sumpffieber (August 22 – September 21, 1942) (Nazi Germany) — anti-partisan operation in Belarus: White Ruthenia
- Operation ? (September 22–26, 1942) (Nazi Germany) — anti-partisan operation in Belarus: Małoryta
- Blitz (September 23 – October 3, 1942) (Nazi Germany) — anti-partisan operation in Belarus: Polotsk, Witebsk
- Karlsbad (October 11–23, 1942) (Nazi Germany) — anti-partisan operation in Belarus: Orsza, Witebsk
- Nürnberg (November 23–29, 1942) (Nazi Germany) — anti-partisan operation in Belarus: Dubrowka
- Hamburg (December 10–21, 1942) (Nazi Germany) — anti-partisan operation in Belarus: Niemen-Szczara
- Altona (December 22–29, 1942) (Nazi Germany) — anti-partisan operation in Belarus: Słonim
- Franz (January 6–14, 1943) (Nazi Germany) — anti-partisan operation in Belarus: Grodsjanka
- Peter (January 10–11, 1943) (Nazi Germany) — anti-partisan operation in Belarus: Kliczów, Kolbcza

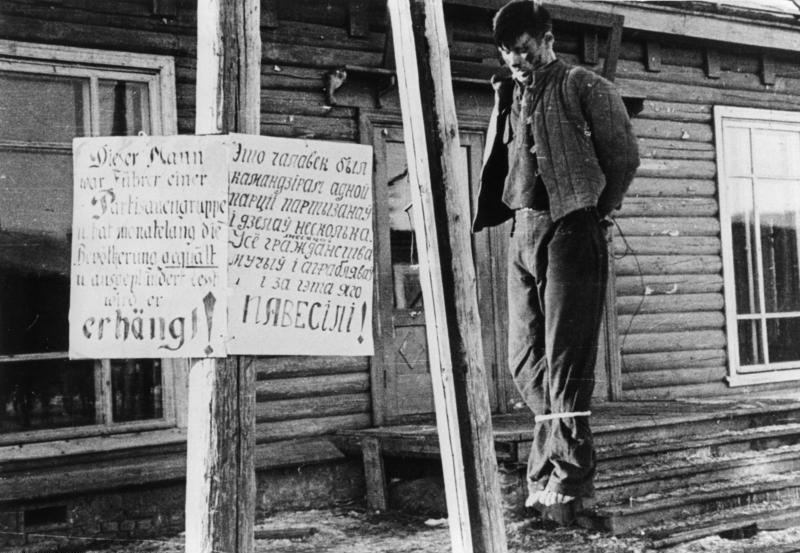
A hanged resistance fighter, Minsk, 1942/1943.

- Operation ? (January 18–23, 1943) (Nazi Germany) — anti-partisan operation in Belarus: Słuck, Mińsk, Czerwień
- Erntefest I (until January 28, 1943) (Nazi Germany) — anti-partisan operation in Belarus: Czerwień, Osipowicze
- Schneehase (January 28 – February 15, 1943) (Nazi Germany) — anti-partisan operation in Belarus: Polotsk, Rossony, Krasnopole
- Waldwinter (until February 1, 1943) (Nazi Germany) — anti-partisan operation in Belarus: Sirotino-Trudy
- Hornung (February 8 – 26, 1943) (Nazi Germany) — anti-partisan operation in Belarus: Lenin, Hancewicze
- Erntefest II (until February 9, 1943) (Nazi Germany) — anti-partisan operation in Belarus: Słuck, Kopyl
- Winterzauber (February 15 – end of March 1943) (Nazi Germany) — anti-partisan operation in Belarus: Oświeja, Latvian border
- Kugelblitz (February 22 - March 8, 1943) (Nazi Germany) — anti-partisan operation in Belarus: Polotsk, Oświeja, Dryssa, Rossony
- Nixe (until March 19, 1943) (Nazi Germany) — anti-partisan operation in Belarus: Ptycz-Mikaszewicze, Pińsk
- Föhn (until March 21, 1943) (Nazi Germany) — anti-partisan operation in Belarus: Pińsk
- Donnerkeil (March 21 – April 2, 1943) (Nazi Germany) — anti-partisan operation in Belarus: Polotsk, Witebsk
- Frühjahrsbestellung (April 18–22, 1943) (Nazi Germany) — anti-partisan operation in north-west Russia: Kudever', Novorzhev
- Volyn and Polissia (May–July, 1943) (Nazi Germany) (Kingdom of Hungary (1920–1946)) — anti-partisan operations in north-western Ukraine: Volyn, Polissia
- Draufgnger II (May 1–9, 1943) (Nazi Germany) — anti-partisan operation in Belarus: Rudnja and Manyly forest
- Maigewitter (May 17–21, 1943) (Nazi Germany) — anti-partisan operation in Belarus: Witebsk, Suraż, Haradok
- Cottbus (May 20 – June 23, 1943) (Nazi Germany) — anti-partisan operation in Belarus: Lepel, Begomel, Uszacz
- Weichsel (May 27 – June 10, 1943) (Nazi Germany) — anti-partisan operation in Belarus: Dniepr-Prypeć Triangle southwest of Homel
- Zigeunerbaron ("Gypsy Baron") (May – June 1943) (Nazi Germany) — anti-partisan operation in Soviet Union in preparations for the Zitadelle ("Citadel")
- Ziethen (June 13–16, 1943) (Nazi Germany) — anti-partisan operation in Belarus: Rzeczyca
- Seydlitz (June 25 – July 27, 1943) (Nazi Germany) — anti-partisan operation in Belarus: Owrucz-Mozyrz
- Günther (until July 14, 1943) (Nazi Germany) — anti-partisan operation in Belarus: Wołoszyn, Łohojsk
- Hermann (July 13 – August 11, 1943) (Nazi Germany) — anti-partisan operation in Belarus: Iwie, Nowogródek, Wołoszyn, Stołpce
- Operation ? (July 30, 1943) (Nazi Germany) — anti-partisan operation in Belarus: Mozyrz
- Fritz (September 24 – October 10, 1943) (Nazi Germany) — anti-partisan operation in Belarus: Głębokie
- Operation ? (October 9–22, 1943) (Nazi Germany) — anti-partisan operation in Belarus: Stary Bychów
- Heinrich (November 1–18, 1943) (Nazi Germany) — anti-partisan operation in Belarus: Rossony, Polotsk, Idrica
- Otto (December 12, 1943 – January 1, 1944) (Nazi Germany) — anti-partisan operation in Belarus: Oświeja
- Operation ? (December 1943) (Nazi Germany) — anti-partisan operation in Belarus: Spasskoje
- Operation ? (December 1943) (Nazi Germany) — anti-partisan operation in Belarus: Biały
- Operation ? (January 14, 1944) (Nazi Germany) — anti-partisan operation in Belarus: Oła
- Operation ? (January 22, 1944) (Nazi Germany) — anti-partisan operation in Belarus: Baiki
- Wolfsjagd (February 3–15, 1944) (Nazi Germany) — anti-partisan operation in Belarus: Hłusk, Bobrujsk
- Sumpfhahn (until February 19, 1944) (Nazi Germany) — anti-partisan operation in Belarus: Hłusk, Bobrujsk
- Operation ? (beginning of March 1944) (Nazi Germany) — anti-partisan operation in Belarus: Berezyna, Bielnicz
- Auerhahn (April 7–17, 1944) (Nazi Germany) — anti-partisan operation in Belarus: Bobrujsk

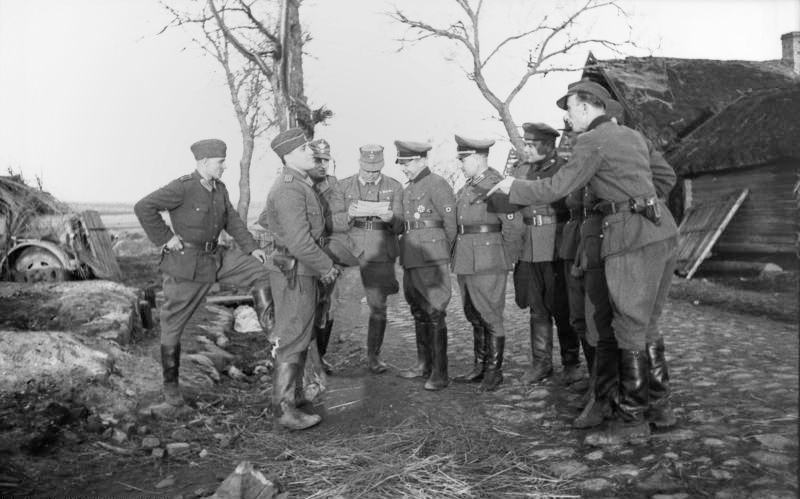
Bronislav Kaminski and 29th Waffen Grenadier Division of the SS RONA (1st Russian), spring 1944.

- Frühlingsfest (April 17 - May 12, 1944) (Nazi Germany) — anti-partisan operation in Belarus: Polotsk, Uszacz
- Kormoran (May 25 – June 17, 1944) (Nazi Germany) — anti-partisan operation in Belarus: Wilejka, Borysów, Mińsk
- Pfingsrose (June 2–13, 1944) (Nazi Germany) — anti-partisan operation in Belarus: Talka
- Pfingstausflug (June 1944) (Nazi Germany) — anti-partisan operation in Belarus: Sienno
- Windwirbel (June 1944) (Nazi Germany) — anti-partisan operation in Belarus: Chidra

=== Yugoslavia ===
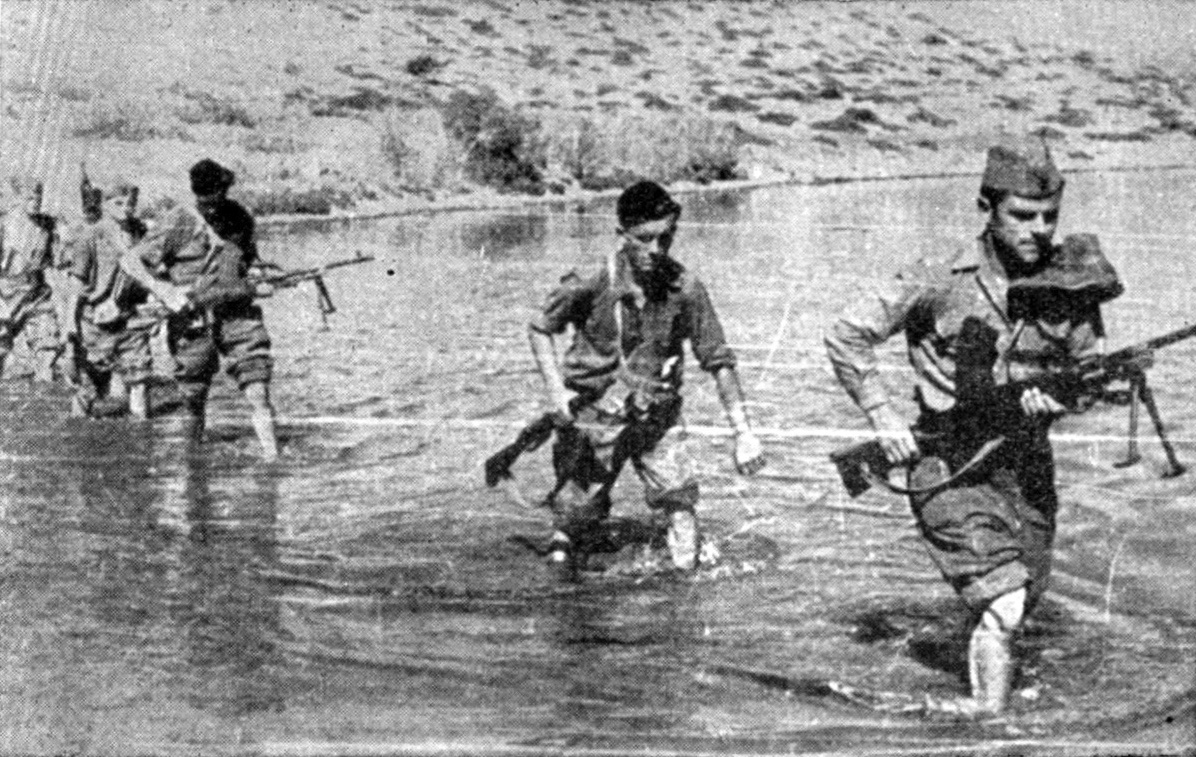
Yugoslav Partisans

- Uzice (27 September – 15 October 1941) (Nazi Germany) (Independent State of Croatia) (Chetniks) (Government of National Salvation) — attempts to suppress partisans in western Serbia
- Battle of Dražgoše (January 9–11, 1942) — the first direct confrontation between the Slovene Partisans and Nazi Germany armed forces; it ended with brutal reprisals of German forces against the villagers and the destruction of the village
- Second anti-Partisan Offensive (January 17–23, 1942) (Nazi Germany) (Fascist Italy) (Independent State of Croatia) — attempts to suppress partisans in eastern Bosnia
- Ozren (26 January – 4 February 1942) (Nazi Germany) (Independent State of Croatia) — two attempts to suppress partisans near Ozren, Bosnia
- Trio (March 31 – June 1942) (Nazi Germany) (Fascist Italy) (Independent State of Croatia) (Chetniks) — also known as the Third anti-Partisan Offensive, action against partisans in region of southern Bosnia
- Operation Alfa (October 5–10, 1942) (Fascist Italy) (Chetniks) (Independent State of Croatia) — an Italian-Chetnik military operation carried out in the Prozor region
- Risnjak (1942) (Fascist Italy) — Italian action against partisans in coastal Croatia and Montenegro
- Fall Weiss ("Case white") (January – April 1943) (Nazi Germany) (Fascist Italy) (Independent State of Croatia) (Chetniks) — also known as the Fourth anti-Partisan Offensive; operations in Yugoslavia
- Schwarz ("Black") (May 15 – June 16, 1943) (Nazi Germany) (Fascist Italy) (Independent State of Croatia) (Tsardom of Bulgaria (1908–1946)) — Fifth anti-Partisan Offensive, Action against partisans in Yugoslavia
- Delphin ("Dolphin") (15 November – 1 December 1943) (Nazi Germany) — Action on central Dalmatian islands
- Adler (November 1943) (Nazi Germany) (Independent State of Croatia) anti-partisan operation on the north Dalmatian coast, between Karlobag and Zadar (Yugoslavia)
- Kugelblitz ("Lightning Ball") (late 1943 and early 1944) (Nazi Germany) — part of the Sixth anti-Partisan Offensive, anti-partisan action near Vitebsk
- Schneestorm ("Snowstorm") (December 1943) (Nazi Germany) — part the Sixth anti-Partisan Offensive, anti-partisan action near Jajce
- Rösselsprung ("Knight's-move") (May 25 – July 3, 1944) (Nazi Germany) — Seventh anti-Partisan Offensive; Action against the Yugoslav Partisan HQ
- Feuerzange ("Fire-Tong") (1944) (Nazi Germany) — Action against Dalmatian Islands in the Adriatic

== See also ==
- Bandenbekämpfung
- List of partisan operations in World War II
- Resistance during World War II
- Sabotage in World War II
- Seven Enemy Offensives
