= Latvian Auxiliary Police =

Latvian collaborationist police units during World War II

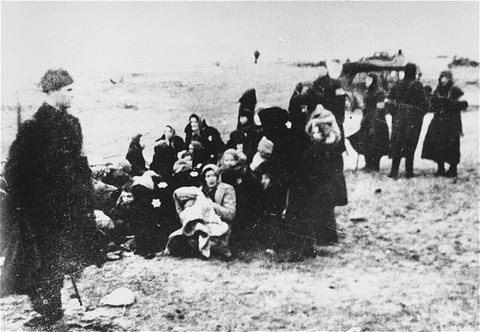
- Members of the Latvian SD Police assemble a group of Jewish women for execution on a beach near Liepāja, December 15, 1941.
- Active: from July 1941
- Allegiance: Nazi Germany
- Engagements: Holocaust in Latvia, Anti-partisan operations in Belarus

Commanders
- Notable commanders: Roberts Blūzmanis

Latvian Auxiliary Police was a paramilitary force created from Latvian volunteers and conscripts by the Nazi German authorities who occupied the country in June/July 1941. It was part of the Schutzmannschaft (Shuma), native police forces organized by the Germans in occupied territories and subordinated to the Order Police (Ordnungspolizei; Orpo). Some units of the Latvian auxiliary police were involved in the Holocaust.

In addition to regular stationary police (patrolmen in cities and towns), 30 police battalions were formed. These mobile groups carried out guard duties of strategic objects or building fortifications, participated in anti-partisan operations and fought on the Eastern Front.

== Formation of units ==
The auxiliary police force consisted primarily of those who had served in Latvian police, army, and militia organization which had been disbanded upon the prior Soviet occupation in 1940. Within the first week of the German occupation, Franz Walter Stahlecker, the leader of Einsatzgruppe A, tasked Lt. Colonel Voldemārs Veiss with organizing a police force to operate under the command of the SS. One of the earliest units formed was in Daugavpils, which German forces reached on June 28, 1941, six days after launching the Operation Barbarossa. Roberts Blūzmanis was appointed chief of the Latvian Auxiliary Police in Nazi-occupied Daugavpils. An auxiliary police force was in Riga under Nazi auspices on July 3, 1941, headed by Latvian captain, Pētersons. According to a German report of July 16, 1941, the auxiliary police force consisted of 240 men in six police districts with some members assigned to Kriminalpolizei (KriPo) and Sicherheitspolizei (SiPo) work.

The Latvian auxiliary police were usually tasked with the arrest of Jews as well as the digging of pits for their graves. One of the most infamous of these executions was the Liepāja massacres of December 12, 1941. Here, as in the case of small towns, the Latvian auxiliary police was directly involved, participating in the arrest of Jews and contributing one firing squad at Šķēde.

The first police battalion (1st Schutzmannschaft Battalion Riga, later 16th Police Battalion Zemgale) was formed in September 1941 and sent to the Eastern Front on October 21. The second of the Latvian police battalions to be sent outside Latvia left for Belarus on December 28, 1941 (numbered 17th by the Germans). The third (the 21st) was sent to the front at Leningrad on March 30, 1942, but at first underwent training and built fortifications there. It was actually placed in the front line in July. The front around Leningrad was held not only by Germans and Finns, but also by Norwegians, Dutch, Danes, Belgians, Lithuanians, Estonians, and the Spanish Blue Division.

According to Betsy Reed,

"By 1943 there were one Latvian SS divisions and around 100,000 Latvians were in German uniform, either in auxiliary police units or in the SS legion. Unusually, the Nazis dispatched their Latvian collaborators way beyond their native territory, to Byelorussia, Ukraine and Warsaw."

== Police battalions ==
=== Activities ===
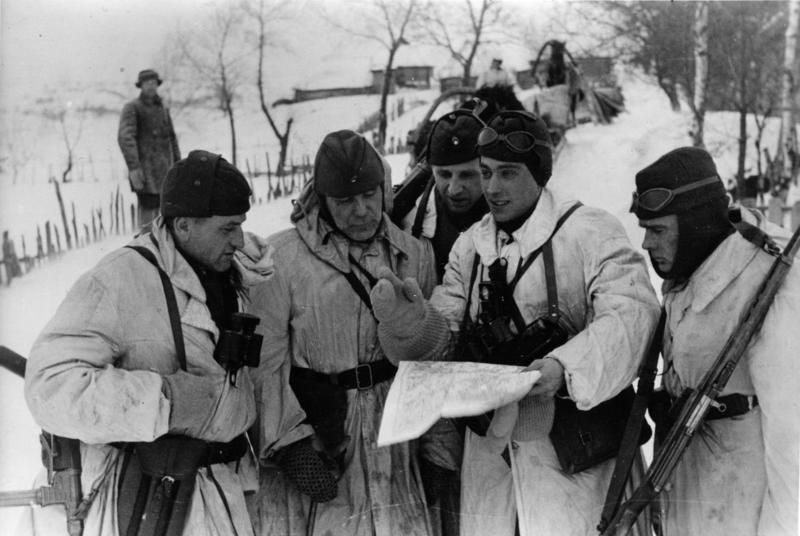
Anti-partisan operation, March 1943

In July 1942, the 22nd Daugava and 272nd Daugavgrīva Battalions were sent to Warsaw where they carried out guard duties on the outside perimeter of the Warsaw Ghetto. The 22nd battalion also participated in convoys of inmates from the ghetto to the Treblinka extermination camp. In February–March 1943, eight Latvian battalions took part in the punitive anti-partisan Operation Winterzauber near the Belarus–Latvia border which resulted in 439 burnt down villages, 10,000 to 12,000 deaths, over 7,000 taken for forced labor or imprisoned at the Salaspils concentration camp.

By 1943, there were 29 Latvian police battalions scattered all over the German-occupied Soviet Union from Leningrad to Crimea. For example, the 17th Battalion fought at Kharkov, the 23rd in Crimea. By 1944, the occupation power, with the collaboration of the Latvian self-administration, had formed a total of 33 auxiliary police battalions.

=== Relations with Germans ===
The police battalions were poorly armed. Therefore, they sometimes even had to steal automatic weapons from German supply depots. To improve the firepower of the 26th Battalion, corporal Žanis Butkus dug up weapons which he had captured as a leader of a group of national partisans in June and July 1941 and which he had hidden from the Germans.

Not all of the service was on the front lines, and the actions in the rear frequently brought Latvians and Germans into conflict. The Latvians had no desire to fight against national partisans, such as Poles and Ukrainians, who were against both Germans and the Soviets. For example, the Latvian battalions stationed for a while near Vilnius established secret communications with the Polish partisans and agreed not to attack each other (when the Poles mistook a Latvian company for Germans and did attack them, they later sent an apology). A battalion on the other side of the former Latvian-Polish border prevented the German SD from collecting and sending Polish women to Germany in September 1943.

=== Restructuring ===
In 1942, the 19th and 21st Latvian police battalions were attached to the 2nd SS Infantry Brigade. The brigade was an international formation that included Dutch, Flemish and Norwegian volunteer legions. Impressed by the conduct of the Latvian battalions, Heinrich Himmler changed the 2nd SS Infantry Brigade into a Latvian brigade and at the same time set the foundations for a Latvian division.

The existing 18th, 24th, and 26th Latvian police battalions serving in the Leningrad front were used to form the brigade's 2nd SS Volunteer Regiment. They were then sent for training at Krasnoye Selo, where Himmler added the 16th Latvian Police Battalion to the brigade in February. On 18 May 1943, these Latvian battalions along with the other three Latvian Legion battalions were incorporated into the 2nd SS Infantry Brigade, and redesignated the 2nd SS Latvian Brigade (later 19th Waffen Grenadier Division of the SS (2nd Latvian)).

On August 1, 1943 four battalions (278th Sigulda, 278th Dobele, 276th Kuldīga and 312th) were incorporated in 1st Police Regiment Riga (Lettisches Freiwilligen Polizei Regiment 1 Riga). In February 1944, two more regiments were formed – 2nd Liepāja (from 22nd Daugava, 25th Abava, 313th and 316th battalions) and 3rd Cēsis (from 317th, 318th and 321st battalions). From July 1944, all three regiments where involved in battles near Daugavpils where they suffered heavy casualties.

Six battalions (20th, 23rd, 267th, 269th, 322nd and 271st) continued their fight in the Courland Pocket until capitulation.

=== List of battalions and regiments ===
- Polizei z. b. V. Bataillon 1 Meiers, October 1944
- Polizei z. b. V. Bataillon 2, October 1944
- Schutzmannschaft Front Bataillon 16 Zemgale, 22 October 1941 – 8 February 1943
- Schutzmannschaft/Lettische Polizei Ost Bataillon 16, 21 March 1942 – 18 May 1942
- Schutzmannschaft Front Bataillon 17 Vidzeme, 21 December 1941 – May 1943
- Schutzmannschaft/Lettische Polizei Ost Bataillon 17 Rēzekne, 18 March 1942 – 18 May 1942
- Schutzmannschaft Front Bataillon 18 Kurzeme, 13 January 1942 – May 1943
- Schutzmannschaft/Lettische Polizei Ost Bataillon 18 Ērgļi, 18 March 1942 – 18 May 1942
- Schutzmannschaft Front Bataillon 19 Latgale, 16 December 1941 – 30 January 1943
- Schutzmannschaft/Lettische Polizei Ost Bataillon 19, 18 March 1942 – 18 May 1942
- Schutzmannschaft/Lettische Polizei Wacht Bataillon 20 Riga, April 1942 – January 1944
- Schutzmannschaft/Lettische Polizei Ost Bataillon 20 Abrene, 9 May 1942 – 18 May 1942
- Schutzmannschaft/Lettische Polizei Front Bataillon 21 Liepāja, 25 February 1942 – 30 January 1943
- Schutzmannschaft/Lettische Polizei Front Bataillon 22 Daugava, 25 February 1942 – 7 February 1944
- Schutzmannschaft/Lettische Polizei Front Bataillon 23 Gauja, 25 February 1942 – 8 May 1945
- Schutzmannschaft/Lettische Polizei Front Bataillon 24 Talsi, 1 March 1942 – 18 April 1943
- Schutzmannschaft/Lettische Polizei Ost Bataillon 24 Venta, June 1942 – 1942
- Schutzmannschaft/Lettische Polizei Front Bataillon 25 Abava, 6 March 1942 – 7 February 1944
- Schutzmannschaft/Lettische Polizei Ost Bataillon 25, June 1942 – July 1942
- Schutzmannschaft/Lettische Polizei Front Bataillon 26 Tukums, 6 March 1942 – 23 April 1943
- Schutzmannschaft/Lettische Polizei Front Bataillon 27 Burtnieki, 14 March 1942 – April 1943
- Schutzmannschaft/Lettische Polizei Front Bataillon 28 Bārta, 9 March 1942 – 13 July 1943
- Schutzmannschaft/Lettische Polizei Ost Bataillon 266, 18 May 1942 – November 1944
- Schutzmannschaft/Lettische Polizei Front Bataillon 267 Rēzekne, 18 May 1942 – 1 June 1943
- Schutzmannschaft/Lettische Polizei Ost Bataillon 268 Ērgļi, 18 May 1942 – 3 February 1944
- Schutzmannschaft/Lettische Polizei Wacht Bataillon 269, 18 May 1942 – June 1943
- Schutzmannschaft/Lettische Polizei Front Bataillon 270, 18 May 1942 – 18 February 1943
- Schutzmannschaft/Lettische Polizei Front Bataillon 271 Valmiera, 15 January 1943 – October 1944, took part in a punitive operation "Winter magic" (Winterzauber)
- Schutzmannschaft/Lettische Polizei Front Bataillon 272 Daugavgrīva, 1 July 1942 – April 1943
- Schutzmannschaft/Lettische Polizei Front Bataillon 273 Ludza, 1 July 1942 – 15 July 1943, took part in a punitive operation "Winter magic"
- Schutzmannschaft/Lettische Polizei Front Bataillon 274, 1 October 1942 – 30 September 1944
- Schutzmannschaft/Lettische Polizei Front Bataillon 275, 16 October 1942 – June 1943
- Schutzmannschaft/Lettische Polizei Front Bataillon 276 Kuldīga, 17 December 1942 – 11 August 1943, took part in a punitive operation "Winter magic"
- Schutzmannschaft/Lettische Polizei Front Bataillon 277 Sigulda, 17 December 1942 – 11 August 1943, took part in a punitive operation "Winter magic"
- Schutzmannschaft/Lettische Polizei Front Bataillon 278 Dobele, 17 December 1942 – 11 August 1943, took part in a punitive operation "Winter magic"
- Schutzmannschaft/Lettische Polizei Front Bataillon 279 Cēsis, 4 January 1943 – 15 July 1943
- Schutzmannschaft/Lettische Polizei Front Bataillon 280 Bolderāja, 23 January 1943 – 9 April 1943, took part in a punitive operation "Winter magic"
- Schutzmannschaft/Lettische Polizei Front Bataillon 281 Abrene, 23 January 1943 – 9 April 1943, took part in a punitive operation "Winter magic"
- Schutzmannschaft/Lettische Polizei Front Bataillon 282 Venta, 1942 – 15 July 1943, took part in a punitive operation "Winter magic"
- Schutzmannschaft/Lettische Polizei Front Bataillon 283, July 1942 – May 1944
- Lettische Polizei Bataillon 283 (Russian), May 1944 – December 1944
- Lettische Polizei Front Bataillon 311 Valmiera, 12 May 1943 – 2 July 1943
- Lettische Polizei Front Bataillon 312, 15 May 1943 – 11 August 1943
- Lettische Polizei Front Bataillon 313, 2 August 1943 – 7 February 1944
- Lettische Polizei Bataillon 314 (Russian), May 1944 – July 1944
- Lettische Polizei Bataillon 315 (Russian), January 1944 – April 1945
- Lettische Polizei Front Bataillon 316, 2 August 1943 – 7 February 1944
- Lettische Polizei Front Bataillon 317, 18 October 1943 – 14 February 1944
- Lettische Polizei Front Bataillon 318, 25 October 1943 – 14 February 1944
- Lettische Polizei Front Bataillon 319, 25 October 1943 – 8 May 1945
- Lettische Polizei Wacht Bataillon 320, 21 December 1943 – 20 September 1944
- Lettische Polizei Front Bataillon 321, 22 December 1943 – 14 February 1944
- Lettische Polizei Front Bataillon 322, 23 July 1944 – 8 May 1945
- Lettische Polizei Front Bataillon 325 (Russian), March 1944 – December 1944
- Lettische Polizei Front Bataillon 326 (Russian), March 1944 – May 1944
- Lettische Polizei Bataillon 327 (Russian), March 1944 – April 1944
- Lettische Polizei Bataillon 328 (Russian), March 1944 – July 1944
- Lettisches Freiwilligen Polizei Regiment 1 Riga, 1 August 1943 – 19 November 1944
- Lettisches Freiwilligen Polizei Regiment 2 Liepāja, February 1944 – 26 October 1944
- Lettisches Freiwilligen Polizei Regiment 3 Cēsis, February 1944 – August 1944

== Post-war activities ==
It has been reported that there are currently former members of the Latvian auxiliary police in the United States, who escaped war crime prosecutions. These include Edgars Inde, who is said to have hidden his participation in war crimes when he came to the United States in 1949 and applied for naturalization. Mr. Inde, who became a citizen in 1955, denied the accusation.

== See also ==
- Estonian Auxiliary Police
- Lithuanian Auxiliary Police
- Ukrainian Auxiliary Police
- Belarusian Auxiliary Police
- Ostlegionen
- Baltic Collaboration with Nazi Germany
- Arjas Kommando
