= Jury Kashyra =

Belarusian Roman Catholic priest (1904–1943)

Blessed Jury Kashyra
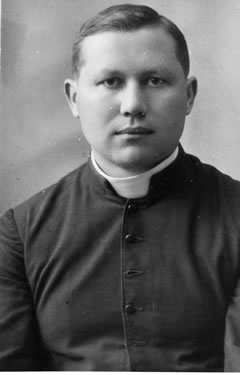
- Born: 4 April 1904; Alieksandrova, Russian Empire (now Belarus)
- Died: 18 February 1943 (aged 38); Rositsa, Byelorussian SSR, Soviet Union (now Belarus)
- Venerated in: Catholic Church
- Beatified: 13 June 1999, Warsaw by Pope John Paul II
- Feast: 18 February

Jury Kashyra (Polish: Jerzy Kaszyra; Belarusian: Юрый Кашыра; 4 April 1904 – 18 February 1943) was a Polish Roman Catholic priest and a Belarusian apostle of the unity between Catholic and Orthodox Christians. He was murdered by the Nazi security forces and their collaborators in Operation Winterzauber, a punitive "bandit fighting" raid, together with his parishioners. Kashyra was beatified by Pope John Paul II in 1999 together with the 108 Blessed Polish Martyrs.

== Early life ==
Jury Kashyra was born in a village in the Russian Empire near Dzisna in a peasant Orthodox Belarusian family converted to Orthodoxy after the Unia, which they were derived, had been banned. His mother found the faith of his ancestors in 1907. He spent his childhood in Vilnius. Kashyra was baptized in an Eastern Orthodox church, but in 1922, at the age of 18, he converted to Catholicism.

== Priestly career ==
In 1924, Kashyra made his novitiate with the Marian Fathers of the Immaculate Conception, a congregation revived before the First World War by Blessed Jurgis Matulaitis-Matulevičius (later Bishop of Vilnius), and congregation in which he completed his secondary education. He made his novitiate at Druya, a city border with Bolshevik Belarus where the congregation opened a school last year and there is a strong minority in Belarus. He took his vows in 1929 and was sent to study philosophy and theology in Rome at the Pontifical University of Saint Thomas Aquinas, Angelicum. He continued his studies at the seminary of the Congregation which is at Vilnius, then was ordained a priest on 20 June 1935. He became a teacher at the high school in Druya and director of the Marianist juniorate. This year marks a change in the internal politics of Poland who knows an authoritarian regime marked by its distance from the Church and secularists who imposes laws on education. Priest Kashyra was sent in 1938 to Rasna in Polesia, but the worst happens when western Poland was invaded by the German Army in September 1939 and the provinces of eastern Poland by the Red Army at the end of the month. Marianists are evicted from their home Rasna at the beginning of 1940 by the Soviets who transform their property in a kolkhoz and Kashyra fled from house to house by Lithuania (who would turn down the Soviet side) to try to reach without success to Druya. He hides for months, until the Wehrmacht hunting the Soviet Lithuania. It can regain Druya in the summer of 1942, where Priest Eugene Kulesza was executed by the Soviets before their departure a year earlier. The town was occupied by the Germans since July 1941. There are still a few weeks until the blessed Anthony Leszczewicz, which restored life to the parish of Rossitsa further east on the other side of the Daugava River is called to work with him. Rossitsa is become Bolshevik side in 1918 and belonging to the Byelorussian Soviet Socialist Republic. The Germans invaded in the summer of 1941 and the Marianists decided to settle there to do their pastoral mission of helping religious eucharistines. Over the months the Germans are becoming increasingly wary of Belarusian nationalism, which they suspect to support the Soviet Union.

== Martyrdom ==
In February 1943, rumors indicated that a punitive operation (called Operation Winterzauber) will be conducted by Lithuanian and Latvian militia, supervised by the SS, to seek revenge against operations of Soviet partisans. Priest Leszczewicz decided to not abandon his flock and Priest Kashyra wished to remain too. They both sacrificed their lives, as stated in their correspondence.

Militia enclosed on 17 February a thousand hostages in the church of Rositsa, where they were voluntarily joined by the two priests to give them spiritual and moral comfort and let them confess. Several hours passed. They managed to negotiate the release of some of the hostages by the German SS officer, but refused the proposal of the latter to let them out too. Finally, the militia and the Nazis locked the hostages in small groups in barns, in which they threw grenades and shot with rifles. Priest Leszczewicz was burned in the fire of a stable and Priest Kashyra burned in a barn a few hours later in the morning of 18 February 1943.

Despite the danger, he remained until the very end with his parishioners in Rositsa, preparing them for the death. On 18 February 1943, he was burnt along with Fr. Anthony Leszczewicz and other people in Rositsa during the war.

== Beatification ==
Jury Kashyra was beatified by Pope John Paul II on 13 June 1999 in Warsaw with a hundred other martyrs of the Second World War. Their memorial day is 12 June.
