= Wartime collaboration in the Baltic states =

WWII-era collaboration in the Baltics

Nazi collaboration occurred in every country occupied by Nazi Germany during the Second World War, including the Baltic states. The three Baltic republics of Estonia, Latvia and Lithuania, were occupied by the Soviet Union in the summer of 1940, and were later occupied by Germany in the summer of 1941 and then incorporated, together with parts of the Byelorussian Soviet Socialist Republic of the Soviet Union (modern Belarus), into the Reichskommissariat Ostland. Collaborators with Germany participated in the Eastern Front against the Soviet Union, as well as in the Holocaust, both in and outside of the Baltic states. This collaboration was done through formal Waffen-SS divisions and police battalions, as well as through spontaneous acts during the opening of the war.

== Estonia ==
In German plans, Estonia was to become an area for future German settlements, as Estonians themselves were considered high on the Nazi racial scale, with potential for Germanization. Unlike the other Baltic states, the seizure of Estonian territory by German troops was relatively long, from July 7 to December 2, 1941. This period was used by the Soviets to carry out a wave of repression against Estonians. It is estimated that the NKVD's subordinate destruction battalions killed some 2,000 Estonian civilians, and 50–60,000 people were deported deep into the USSR. 10,000 of them died in the GULAG system within a year. Many Estonians fought against Soviet troops on the German side, hoping to liberate their country. Some 12,000 Estonian partisans took part in the fighting. Of great importance were the 57 Finnish-trained members of the Erna group, who operated behind enemy lines.

Resistance groups were organised by Germans in August 1941 into the Omakaitse (lit. 'Self-defence'), which had between 34,000 and 40,000 members, mainly based on the Kaitseliit, dissolved by the Soviets. Omakaitse was in charge of clearing the German army's rear of Red Army soldiers, NKVD members, and Communist activists. Within a year its members killed 5,500 Estonian residents. Later, they performed guard duty and fought Soviet partisans flown into Estonia. From among Omakaitse members were recruited Estonian policemen, members of the Estonian Auxiliary Police and officers of the Estonian 20th Waffen-SS Division.

The Germans formed a puppet government, the Estonian Self-Administration, headed by Hjalmar Mäe. This government had considerable autonomy in internal affairs, such as filling police posts. The Security Police in Estonia (SiPo) had a mixed Estonian-German structure (139 Germans and 873 Estonians) and was formally under the Estonian Self-Administration. Estonian police cooperated with Germans in rounding up Jews, Roma, communists and those deemed enemies of existing order or asocial elements. The police also helped to conscript Estonians for forced labor and military service under German command. Most of the small population of Estonian Jews fled before the Germans arrived, with only about a thousand remaining. All of them were arrested by Estonian police and executed by Omakaitse. Members of the Estonian Auxiliary Police and 20th Waffen-SS Division also executed Jewish prisoners sent to concentration and labor camps established by the Germans on Estonian territory.

Immediately after entering Estonia, the Germans began forming volunteer Estonian units the size of a battalion. By January 1942, six Security Groups (battalions No. 181-186, about 4,000 men) had been formed and were subordinate to the Wehrmacht 18th Army. After the one-year contract expired, some volunteers transferred to the Waffen-SS or returned to civilian life, and three Eastern Battalions (No. 658-660) were formed from those who remained. They fought until early 1944, after which their members transferred to the 20th Waffen-SS Division.

Beginning in September 1941, the SS and police command created four Infantry Defence Battalions (No. 37-40) and a reserve and sapper battalion (No. 41-42), which were operationally subordinate to the Wehrmacht. From 1943 they were called Police Battalions, with 3,000 serving in them. In 1944 they were transformed into two infantry battalions and evacuated to Germany in the fall of 1944, where they were incorporated into the 20th Waffen-SS Division.

In the fall of 1941, the Germans also formed eight police battalions (No. 29-36), of which only Battalion No. 36 had a typically military purpose. However, due to shortages, most of them were sent to the front near Leningrad, and were mostly disbanded in 1943. That same year, the SS and police command created five new Security and Defense Battalions (they inherited No. 29-33 and had more than 2,600 men). In the spring of 1943, five Defence Battalions (No. 286-290) were established as compulsory military service units. The 290th Battalion consisted of Estonian Russians. Battalions No. 286, 288 and 289 were used to fight partisans in Belarus.

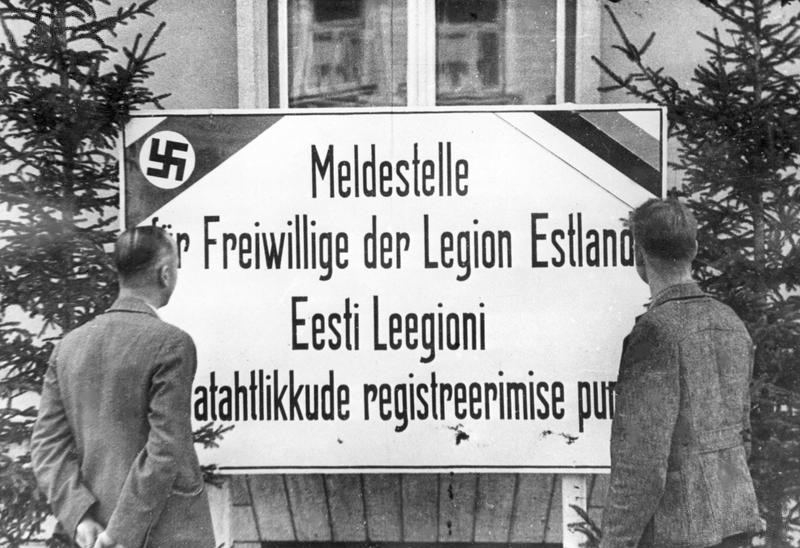
The recruiting center for the Waffen-SS Estonian Legion

On Aug. 28, 1942, the Germans formed the volunteer Estonian Waffen-SS Legion. Of the approximately 1,000 volunteers, 800 were incorporated into Battalion Narva and sent to Ukraine in the spring of 1943. Due to the shrinking number of volunteers, in February 1943 the Germans introduced compulsory conscription in Estonia. Born between 1919 and 1924 faced the choice of going to work in Germany, joining the Waffen-SS or Estonian auxiliary battalions. 5,000 joined the Estonian Waffen-SS Legion, which was reorganized into the 3rd Estonian Waffen-SS Brigade.

As the Red Army advanced, a general mobilization was announced, officially supported by Estonia's last Prime Minister Jüri Uluots. By April 1944, 38,000 Estonians had been drafted. Some went into the 3rd Waffen-SS Brigade, which was enlarged to division size (20th Waffen-SS Division: 10 battalions, more than 15,000 men in the summer of 1944) and also incorporated most of the already existing Estonian units (mostly Eastern Battalions). Younger men were conscripted into other Waffen-SS units. From the rest, six Border Defense Regiments and four Police Fusilier Battalions (Nos. 286, 288, 291, and 292).

The Estonian Security Police and SD, the 286th, 287th and 288th Estonian Auxiliary Police battalions, and 2.5–3% of the Estonian Omakaitse (Home Guard) militia units (between 1,000 and 1,200 men) took part in rounding up, guarding or killing of 400–1,000 Roma and 6,000 Jews in concentration camps in the Pskov region of Russia and the Jägala, Vaivara, Klooga and Lagedi concentration camps in Estonia.

Guarded by these units, 15,000 Soviet POWs died in Estonia: some through neglect and mistreatment and some by execution.

== Latvia ==
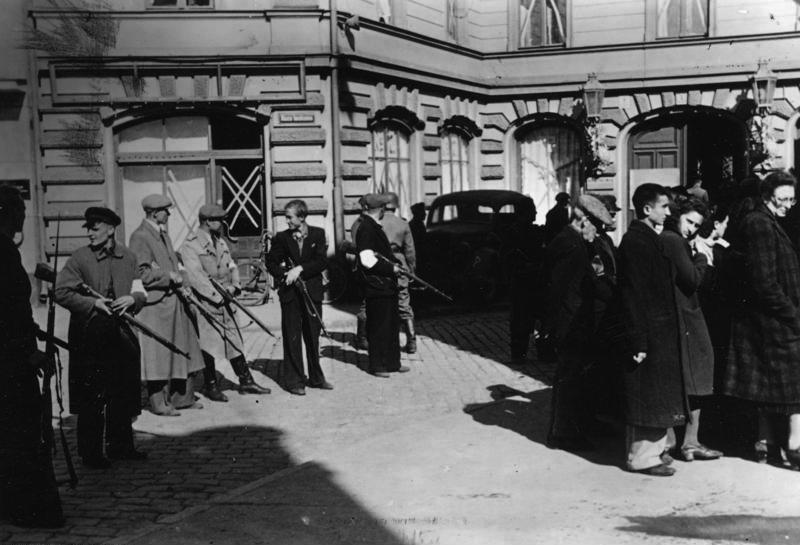
Latvian Auxiliary Police assemble a group of Jews, Liepāja, July 1941.

Deportations and murders of Latvians by the Soviet NKVD reached their peak in the days before the capture of Soviet-occupied Riga by German forces. Those that the NKVD could not deport before the Germans arrived were shot at the Central Prison. The RSHA's instructions to their agents to unleash pogroms fell on fertile ground. After the Einsatzkommando 1a and part of Einsatzkommando 2 entered the Latvian capital, Einsatzgruppe A's commander Franz Walter Stahlecker made contact with Viktors Arājs on 1 July and instructed him to set up a commando unit. It was later named Latvian Auxiliary Police or Arajs Kommandos. The members, far-right students and former officers were all volunteers, and free to leave at any time.

The next day, 2 July, Stahlecker instructed Arājs to have the Arājs Kommandos unleash pogroms that looked spontaneous, before the German occupation authorities were properly established. Einsatzkommando-influenced mobs of former members of Pērkonkrusts and other extreme right-wing groups began pillaging and making mass arrests, and killed 300 to 400 Riga Jews. Killings continued under the supervision of SS Brigadeführer Walter Stahlecker, until more than 2,700 Jews had died.

The activities of the Einsatzkommando were constrained after the full establishment of the German occupation authority, after which the SS made use of select units of native recruits. German General Wilhelm Ullersperger and Voldemārs Veiss, a well known Latvian nationalist, appealed to the population in a radio address to attack "internal enemies". During the next few months, the Latvian Auxiliary Security Police primarily focused on killing Jews, Communists and Red Army stragglers in Latvia and in neighbouring Byelorussia.

In February–March 1943, eight Latvian battalions took part in the punitive anti-partisan Operation Winterzauber near the Belarus–Latvia border, which resulted in 439 burned villages, 10,000 to 12,000 deaths, and over 7,000 taken for forced labor or imprisoned at the Salaspils concentration camp. This group alone killed almost half of Latvia's Jewish population, about 26,000 Jews, mainly in November and December 1941.

The creation of the Arājs Kommando was "one of the most significant inventions of the early Holocaust", and marked a transition from German-organised pogroms to systematic killing of Jews by local volunteers (former army officers, policemen, students, and Aizsargi). This helped with a chronic German personnel shortage and provided the Germans with relief from the psychological stress of routinely murdering civilians. By the autumn of 1941, the SS had deployed the Latvian Auxiliary Police battalions to Leningrad, where they were consolidated into the 2nd Latvian SS Infantry Brigade. In 1943, this brigade, which later became the 19th Waffen Grenadier Division of the SS (2nd Latvian), was consolidated with the 15th Waffen Grenadier Division of the SS (1st Latvian) to become the Latvian Legion. Although the Latvian Legion was a formally volunteer Waffen-SS unit, it was voluntary only in name; approximately 80–85% of its men were conscripts.

== Lithuania ==
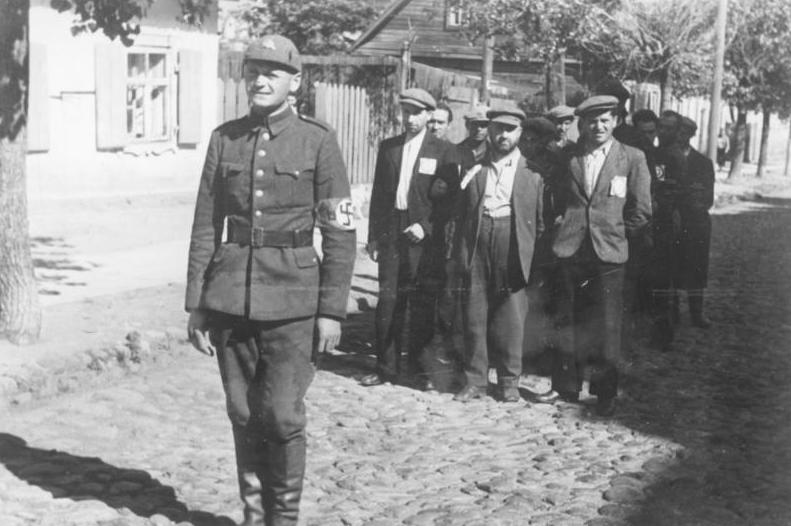
Lithuanian LSP policeman with Jewish prisoners, Vilnius, 1941

Prior to the German invasion, some leaders in Lithuania and in exile believed Germany would grant the country autonomy, as they had the Slovak Republic. The German intelligence service Abwehr believed that it controlled the Lithuanian Activist Front, a pro-German organization based at the Lithuanian embassy in Berlin. Lithuanians formed the Provisional Government of Lithuania on their own initiative, but Germany did not recognize it diplomatically, or allow Lithuanian ambassador Kazys Škirpa to become prime minister, instead actively thwarting his activities. The provisional government disbanded, since it had no power and it had become clear that the Germans came as occupiers not liberators from Soviet occupation, as initially thought.

Units under Algirdas Klimaitis and supervised by SS Brigadeführer Walter Stahlecker started pogroms in and around Kaunas on 25 June 1941. Lithuanian collaborators killed hundreds of thousands of Jews, Poles and Gypsies. According to Lithuanian-American scholar Saulius Sužiedėlis, an increasingly antisemitic atmosphere clouded Lithuanian society, and antisemitic LAF émigrés "needed little prodding from 'foreign influences'". He concluded that Lithuanian collaboration was "a significant help in facilitating all phases of the genocidal program . . . [and that] the local administration contributed, at times with zeal, to the destruction of Lithuanian Jewry". Elsewhere, Sužiedėlis similarly emphasised that Lithuania's "moral and political leadership failed in 1941, and that thousands of Lithuanians participated in the Holocaust", though he warned that "[u]ntil buttressed by reliable accounts providing time, place and at least an approximate number of victims, claims of large-scale pogroms before the advent of the German forces must be treated with caution".

In 1941, the Lithuanian Security Police was created, subordinate to Nazi Germany's Security Police and Criminal Police. Of the 26 Lithuanian Auxiliary Police Battalions, 10 were involved in the Holocaust. On August 16, the head of the Lithuanian police, Vytautas Reivytis, ordered the arrest of Jewish men and women with Bolshevik activities: "In reality, it was a sign to kill everyone." The Special SD and German Security Police Squad in Vilnius killed 70,000 Jews in Paneriai and other places. In Minsk, the 2nd Battalion shot about 9,000 Soviet prisoners of war, and in Slutsk it massacred 5,000 Jews.

In March 1942, in Poland, the 2nd Lithuanian Battalion guarded the Majdanek concentration camp. In July 1942, the 2nd Battalion participated in the deportation of Jews from the Warsaw Ghetto to Treblinka extermination camp. In August–October 1942, some of the Lithuanian police battalions were in Belarus and Ukraine: the 3rd in Molodechno, the 4th in Donetsk, the 7th in Vinnytsa, the 11th in Korosten, the 16th in Dnepropetrovsk, the 254th in Poltava and the 255th in Mogilev (Belarus). One battalion was also used to put down the Warsaw Ghetto Uprising in 1943.

The participation of the local populace was a key factor in the Holocaust in Nazi-occupied Lithuania which resulted in the near total decimation of Lithuanian Jews living in the Nazi-occupied Lithuanian territories. From 25 July 1941, participation was under the Generalbezirk Litauen of Reichskommissariat Ostland. Out of approximately 210,000 Jews, (208,000 according to the Lithuanian pre-war statistical data) an estimated 195,000–196,000 perished before the end of World War II (wider estimates are sometimes published); most from June to December 1941. The events happening in the USSR's western regions occupied by Nazi Germany in the first weeks after the German invasion (including Lithuania – see map) marked the sharp intensification of the Holocaust.

== Citations and references ==
=== Bibliography ===
- Angrick, Andrej; Klein, Peter (2009). The "Final Solution" in Riga: Exploitation and Annihilation, 1941–1944. Studies on War and Genocide. Vol. 14. ISBN 978-1-84545-608-5.
- Birn, Ruth Bettina (March 1997). "Revising the Holocaust". The Historical Journal. 40 (1): 195–215. doi:10.1017/S0018246X9600708X. S2CID 162951971.
- Breitman, Richard (September 1991). "Himmler and the 'Terrible Secret' among the Executioners". Journal of Contemporary History. 26 (3/4). Sage Publications: 431–451. doi:10.1177/002200949102600305. JSTOR 260654. S2CID 159733077.
- Birn, Ruth Bettina (2001). "Collaboration with Nazi Germany in Eastern Europe: The Case of the Estonian Security Police". Contemporary European History. 10 (2). Cambridge University Press: 181–198. doi:10.1017/S0960777301002016. ISSN 0960-7773. JSTOR 20081785. S2CID 143520561.
- Haberer, Eric (December 2001). "Intention and feasibility: Reflections on collaboration and the final solution". East European Jewish Affairs. 31 (2): 64–81. doi:10.1080/13501670108577951. S2CID 143574047.
- Hiio, Toomas (2011). "Estonian Units in the Wehrmacht, SS and Police System, as well as the Waffen-SS, during World War II". Eesti Sõjaajaloo Aastaraamat / Estonian Yearbook of Military History. 1.
- Sužiedėlis, Saulius (2004). Gaunt, David; Levine, Paul A.; Palosuo, Laura (eds.). Collaboration and Resistance During the Holocaust: Belarus, Estonia, Latvia, Lithuania. Frankfurt am Main, Bern, New York: Peter Lang, and Oxford.
- Wnuk, Rafał (2018). Leśni bracia. Podziemie antykomunistyczne na Litwie, Łotwie i w Estonii 1944–1956 [Forest Brothers. Anti-communist underground in Lithuania, Latvia and Estonia 1944–1956]. Lublin.
