= Alexander Dyukov =

Alexander Dyukov may refer to:

- Alexander Reshideovich Dyukov (born 1978), Russian historian and journalist
- Alexander Valeryevich Dyukov, (born 1967), chairman of Gazprom and president of Russian Premier League team Zenit St. Petersburg
