= Operation Winterzauber =

German punitive operation in Belarus and Russia during World War II

- Part of Bandenbekämpfung in German-occupied Belarus and the Eastern Front of World War II
Date
Location
15 February – 30 March 1943
- Byelorussian SSR: Verkhnyadzvinsk, Polotsk, and Rasony Districts
- Russian SFSR: Sebezhsky District

Belligerents
Germany	Soviet Union

Commanders and leaders
Friedrich Jeckeln; Viktors Arājs	Pyotr Masherov

Units involved
3rd Panzer Army; Latvian Auxiliary Police; Lithuanian Auxiliary Police Battalions; Estonian Auxiliary Police; Ukrainian Auxiliary Police	Soviet Belarusian partisans; Soviet Latvian partisans

Strength
4,000	Unknown

Casualties and losses
- German estimate; Several hundred villages destroyed; 3904 civilians killed; 7,465 captured for forced labour; 2,000 deported to Salaspils camp; Russian estimate by Aleksandr Dyukov: 439 villages destroyed; 10,000–12,000 civilians killed; Over 7,000 deported to Salaspils camp; 15 km (9.3 mi) "dead zone" completely depopulated

Operation Winterzauber (also translated into English as Operation Winter Magic) was an anti-partisan operation from 15 February to 30 March 1943 aimed at creating a depopulated zone of 30–40 km (19–25 mi) along the Belarusian–Latvian border. It was mainly conducted by Latvian collaborators under German command in northern Belarus and in Sebezhsky District in Russia. In the Soviet Union, the operation became known as the Osveya Tragedy. (Note: Belarusian: Асвейская трагедыя, romanized: Asviejskaja trahiedyja; Russian: Освейская трагедия, romanized: Osveyskaya tragediya) The Foreign Ministry of the Russian Federation has described Operation Winterzauber as a crime against humanity.

== Objectives ==
The operation was to establish a buffer zone devoid of people and settlements to a width of 40 km between Drissa in the South Zilupe and Smolnya in the North, covering the area of Asveya — Drysa — Polotsk — Sebezh — Rasony (Belarus, Russia). This depopulated area was to deprive the partisans of their strong points and resources.

== The operation and death toll ==
Several hundred villages were destroyed. The executions were carried out in the villagers' own homes, with the bodies covered in straw and the houses set on fire. Evidence from Russian sources indicates that many were deliberately burned alive. The rest, mostly women and children, were sent on foot to the place of the so-called "second sluicing"; those who were exhausted on the way were shot. Modular camps people were sent to other camps, including Salaspils concentration camp near Riga, where women were separated from their children and sent to work in Germany or in Latvia.

From 16–18 February 1943, the Nazis destroyed the village of Rositsa. Younger and stronger people were sent to the station of Bigosovo, where they were loaded into wagons and taken to the Salaspils camp and work in Latvia and Germany. The remaining people were burned in houses, a large group of people was driven into a barn that was then set on fire. Among those killed were Roman Catholic priests Jury Kashyra and Antoni Leszczewicz. The former was burned alongside the rest of the residents of the village, the other was shot for persistent requests to save the children (or, according to other sources also burned). In 1999, Pope John Paul II declared the murdered priests blessed.

Surviving witness Valentin Martsinkevich, who was ten years old at the time of the atrocity, recalled:

We gathered and were led along the road. Crossed the river, and there on the tanks, the SS and the dogs. They drove us to the village Kulakovo. Women with children were placed in the local school, men inside the barn. Then the interpreter tells us and two other families who were sitting nearby to leave. At the porch there was a sled. We sat down in it, rode thirty meters, and we saw that the school was on fire. It was first doused with gasoline and then fired on with incendiary bullets. The barn with the men was also set on fire. Those trying to get out through the windows or the roof were shot. Women began to scream, and the policeman took the whip and began to hit hard and scream: "Be quiet, or I'll shoot!"

She recalled that they were transported by train to Salaspils concentration camp. No food or water was given them during the transport, and small children died on the way. At a stop in Daugavpils, they asked passers-by to throw the snow through the window into the train coach.

According to controversial Russian historian Alexander Dyukov, during this operation 221 partisans and about 3,900 local inhabitants were killed, over 7,000 were deported for forced labor or imprisoned to Salaspils concentration camp, 439 villages were burnt down or 70 partisans and about 10-12 thousands of local inhabitants were killed, including women and children and a "dead zone" to a width of 15 km was established.

According to Ministry of Foreign Affairs of Russia in the Asvieja District alone, 183 villages were burned down, 11,383 people were killed, and 14,175 residents were taken as forced labour. Partisans in Novgorod region, Belarusian partisans, Soviet partisans in Latvia, and the populace themselves had resisted the invaders desperately. The most famous episode was the fight of ninety Soviet Latvian partisans against four Latvian punitive battalions supported by tanks and aircraft, on the hill Apsu Kalny. To rescue civilians, the command of the Soviet 6th air army carried out an air operation, during which eight to eleven thousand people were evacuated to Soviet territory.

== Commemorations ==
In Belarus, events take place dedicated to the memory of the victims. In February 2008, in the Verkhnedvinsk district house of culture held a literary-musical composition "St. Aswe Complaints" with poems by Belarusian poets and memories shared by witnesses. In the village Osveya near the mound of Immortality a meeting of war veterans, youth, and the public was held, which was addressed by politicians, priest, and former young prisoners of Salaspils. Events take place in other localities.

== Punitive formations ==
The operation was supervised by the Higher SS and Police Leader of the Baltic region SS-Obergruppenführer Friedrich Jeckeln.

The operation was mainly held by Latvian Police Battalions:

- 271st Aizpute Latvian Police Battalion;
- 273rd Ludza Latvian Police Battalion;
- 276th Kuldiga Latvian Police Battalion;
- 277th Sigulda Latvian Police Battalion;
- 278th Dobele Latvian Police Battalion;
- 280th Bolderaya Latvian Police Battalion;
- 281st Abrene Latvian Police Battalion.

The operation initially also involved:

- The 50th Ukrainian police battalion
- SS police company
- German anti-aircraft part
- German artillery battery of the division
- two German communications platoons
- 2nd air group of special purpose.

O. Original German units and Ukrainian police battalion were not included in the composition of combat groups, serving as reserve command.

During the operation, new formation were added:

- Hastily formed 282nd Latvian "security" battalion
- The 2nd Lithuanian police battalion
- Rota 36th Estonian police battalion
- Einsatzkommando of the security police under the command of SS obersturmfuhrer Krause
- Einsatzkommando DM under the command of SS hauptsturmfuhrer Kaufman

The total number of Einsatzkommando of the security police and the SD were 210 people. The total strength of the forces involved in the operation was about 4000 people.

The following units were later added: the Ukrainian and Lithuanian police battalions of the German police company of the SS, the German motorized gendarmerie platoon and attached to Einsatzkommando of the security police and the SD.

For example, the battle group "Bertha" included:

3rd tank army;

- The 201st security division
- 281st security division
- 391st training field division.
