= Anti-partisan operations in Volyn–Polesia =

Anti-Partisan Operations in Volyn and Polissia
- Part of the Eastern Front of World War II and German anti-partisan operations
Date	May–July 1943
Location	Volhynia, Polesia
Result	Ukrainian victory

Belligerents
Ukrainian Insurgent Army: UPA North	Germany; Blue Police; Pro-German Cossacks; Hungary

Commanders and leaders
Colonel "Vovchak"	Bach-Zelewski; Viktor Lutze †

Strength
Unknown	10,000; 3 Battalions; 2 Regiments

Casualties and losses
1,200 casualties	Heavy: 3,000+ casualties
- 5,000 civilians killed

The Anti-Partisan Operations in Volyn and Polissia were carried out as part of the German Operation BB (Bandenbekämpfung) or ("bandit warfare") against the Ukrainian Insurgent Army, especially its Northern Group, in May–July 1943.

== Prelude ==
During the spring of 1943, Ukrainian partisans conducted major anti-German operations with success. In April, UPA inflicted hundreds of casualties on German troops and Blue Police during their raids. The situation for Germans was getting worse. By summer, they were limited to only controlling the large cities and major military bases. This undermined the Nazi ability to exploit Ukraine. For this reason, Bach-Zelewski was appointed to lead major operations against the Ukrainian partisans, especially UPA North which was believed to be the core of Ukrainian Insurgent Army.

== Operations ==
Zelewski had a massive strength in the form of artillery, tanks and aircraft at his disposal, which he used to "struck hard" on insurgents. Luftwaffe in particular with their "diving death" aircraft devastated much of Volyn and Polissia, with "red and orange flames" being visible in the aftermath of bombardments. These operations were also aimed at terrorizing Ukrainian population into obedience.

On May 1, Viktor Lutze was mortally wounded during UPA ambush, who was known for being Erich Koch's right-hand. German media covered up this event as "traffic accident". Germans intended to carry out punitive actions in Volyn. On May 9, Germans assaulted the Lobechevka settlement with support of aircraft, but were routed by partisans. On May 20, UPA raided Chudel in Sarny region and killed 30 German troops. German unit terrorised Yapolot settlement in Kospopil region, then they got encircled and defeated by insurgents. UPA conducted operations in Ostroh, Shumsky and Mizok districts.

On June 7, German command intensified their anti-partisan operations. On June 26, partisans killed 11 German troops in Kharaimovka and Derazhnyansky districts.

On July 5, German unit was defeated during their attack on Kaskove settlement. On July 17, UPA partisans killed 10 Germans troops and Polish policemen in Khmelyivka. Germans lost 34 troops near Zholobne settlement of Yarun district. On July 24, German troops responded to UPA sabotage by burning Tulichiv, Abramivtsi, Tarachyn, Lityn, and Radovichi villages in the Turiisk Raion. However, German forces also encountered resistance and suffered over 100 casualties. UPA conducted raids into Zhytomyr region. In July, German-Hungarian detachment launched an attack on Volyn, but they were defeated. UPA defeated German forces in Ustynivka settlement of Potiyivske district and destroyed German police. German forces conducted numerous other assaults on the villages. These operations weren't successful and mainly affected civilians. German propaganda attempted to portray UPA as "an instrument of Jewish Bolshevism" cooperating with Moscow.

== Aftermath ==
The anti-partisan operations of Bach-Zelewski resulted in German failure and only increased the local support for Ukrainian partisans. UPA and German forces fought over 178 battles against each other during this period. UPA fought successfully in many of these battles. As a result of summer fighting, Ukrainian insurgents lost 1,200 troops while Germans lost over 3,000 troops. 5,000 civilians were killed. During July–August, Bach-Zelewski led a large SS force, which fought 59 clashes with UPA. These clashes resulted in 1,237 insurgent and 3,000 German casualties. However, the offensive failed to significantly weaken insurgents.
