= Rasony district =

District of Vitebsk region, Belarus

Rasony district Расонскі раён (Belarusian) Россонский район (Russian)
- District
- Flag Coat of arms

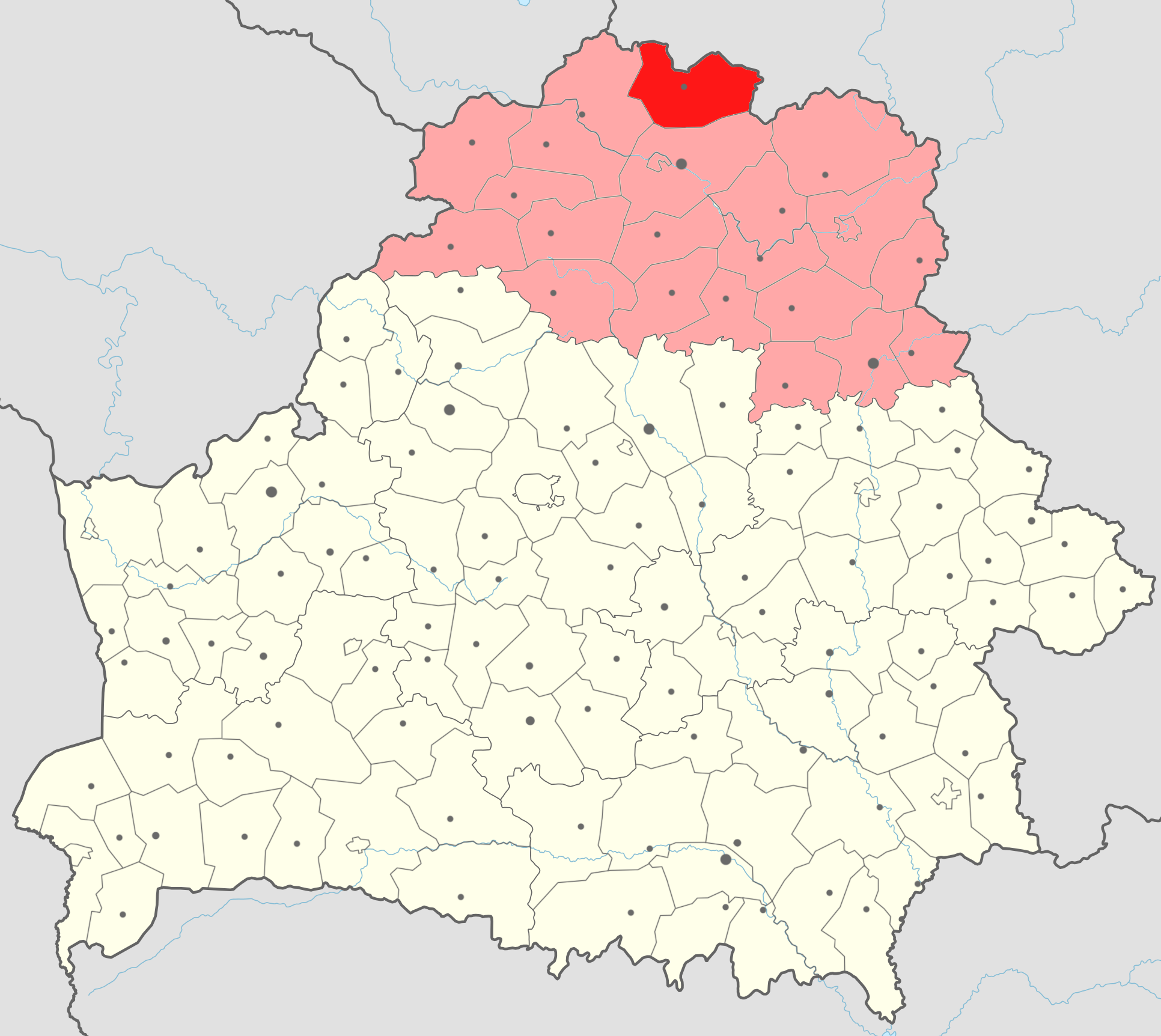
- Coordinates: 55°54′15″N 28°48′53″E
- Country: Belarus
- Region: Vitebsk region
- Administrative center: Rasony

Area
  - Total: 1,924.72 km^{2} (743.14 sq mi)

Population (2023)
  - Total: 8,523
  - Density: 4.428/km^{2} (11.47/sq mi)
- Time zone: UTC+3 (MSK)

Rasony district (Belarusian: Расонскі раён; Russian: Россонский район) is a district (raion) of Vitebsk region in Belarus. The administrative center of the district is Rasony.

Lake Neshcharda, the seventh-largest lake in Belarus, is situated in the district.

== History ==
During World War II, Rasony District was a large part of the Belarusian partisans. Led by Pyotr Masherov, the partisan movement in Rasony began in 1941, and continued until Operation Bagration liberated Belarus from Nazi Germany in 1944.

== Notable residents ==
- Jan Barszczewski (1797, Mirahi village – 1851), "one of the founders of modern Belarusian literature"
- Hienadz Buraǔkin (1936, Šulacina village – 2014), Belarusian poet, journalist and diplomat
