= Wołoszyn =

Mountain in Poland

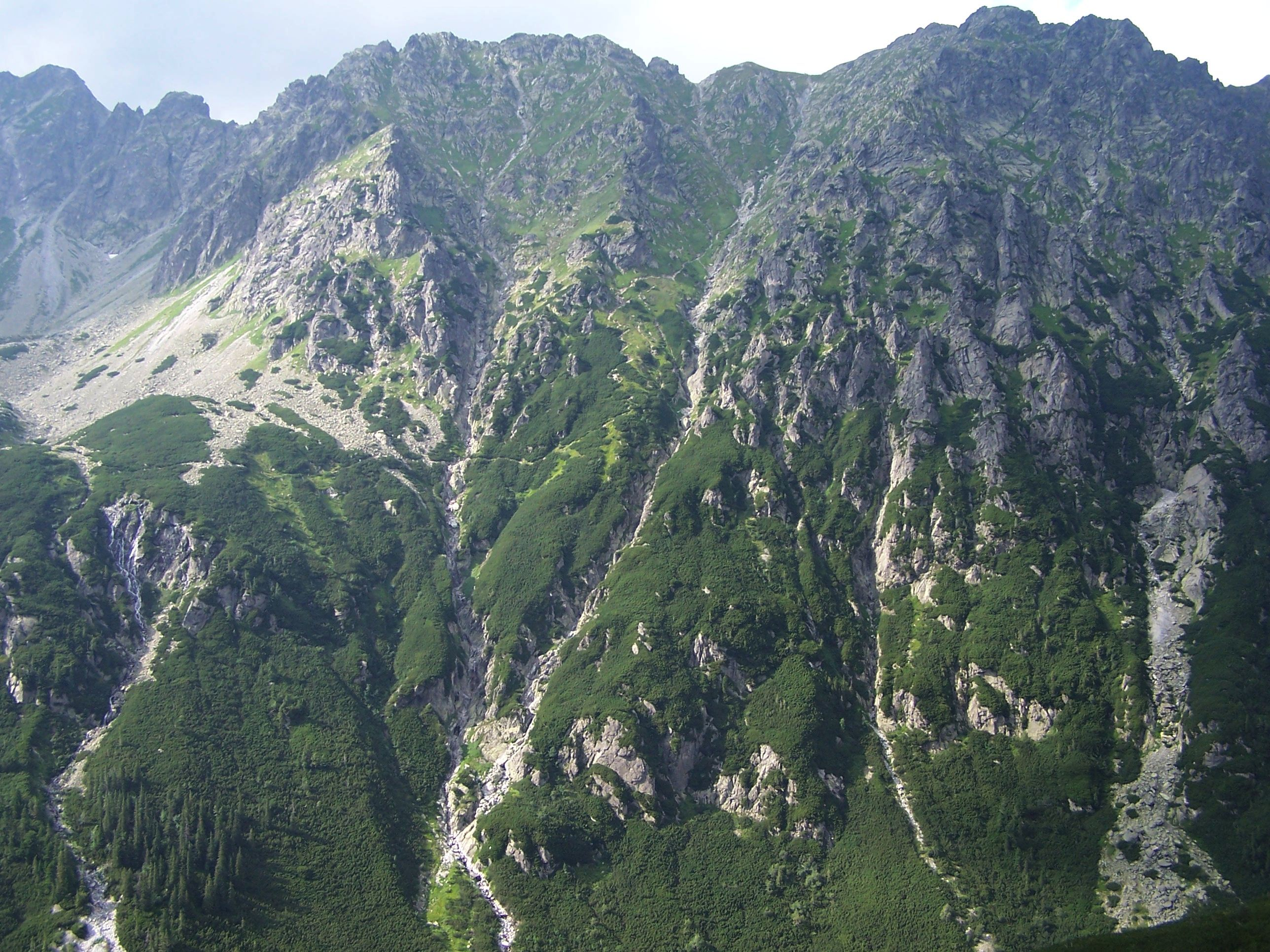

Highest point
- Elevation: 2,155 m (7,070 ft)
- Coordinates: 49°13′42″N 20°03′00″E

Geography
- Location: Poland
- Parent range: High Tatras, Tatra Mountains

Climbing
- First ascent: August 16, 1867 (first recorded)
- Easiest route: Hike

Wołoszyn is a mountain massif in the High Tatra Mountains in Poland. It reaches 2,155 meters at its highest peak.

Wołoszyn is located in the Polish Tatra National Park.
