= Lake Neshcharda =

Lake in Vitebsk Region, Belarus

Neshcharda/Neshcherdo
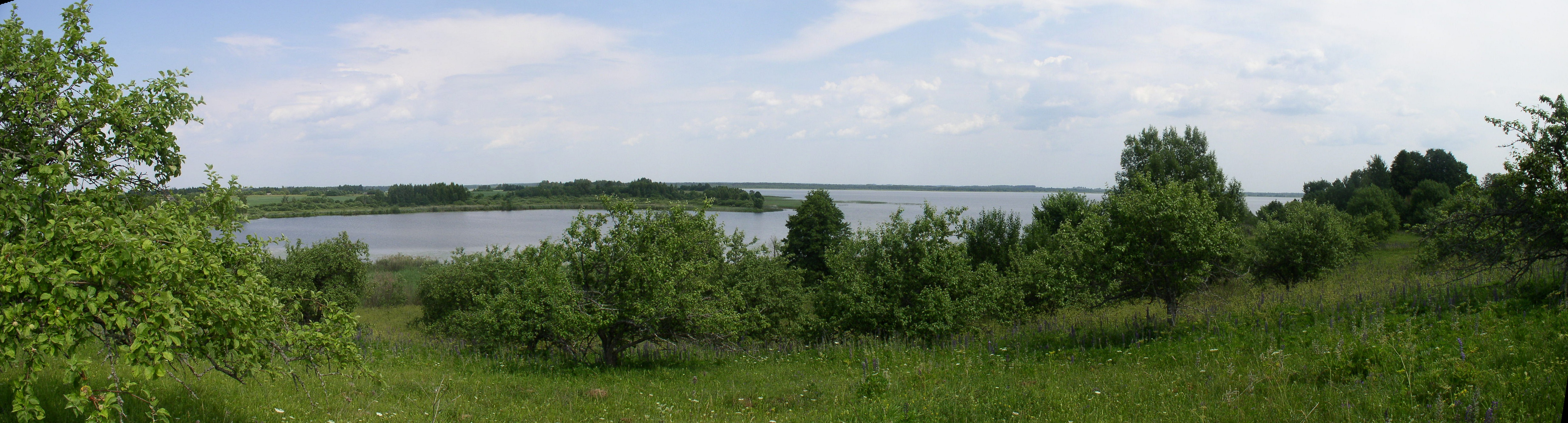
- Lake Neshcherdo

- Location within Belarus
- Location: Belarus
- Coordinates: 55.903°N 29.068°E
- Lake type: freshwater
- Surface area: 24.6 km^{2} (9.5 sq mi)
- Average depth: 3.4 m (11 ft)
- Max. depth: 8.1 m (27 ft)

Lake Neshcharda (Belarusian: Возера Нешчарда) or Lake Neshcherdo (Russian: Неще́рдо озеро) is a large freshwater lake in the Vitsebsk Voblast, northern Belarus.
