= Voldemārs Veiss =

Latvian officer and Nazi collaborator

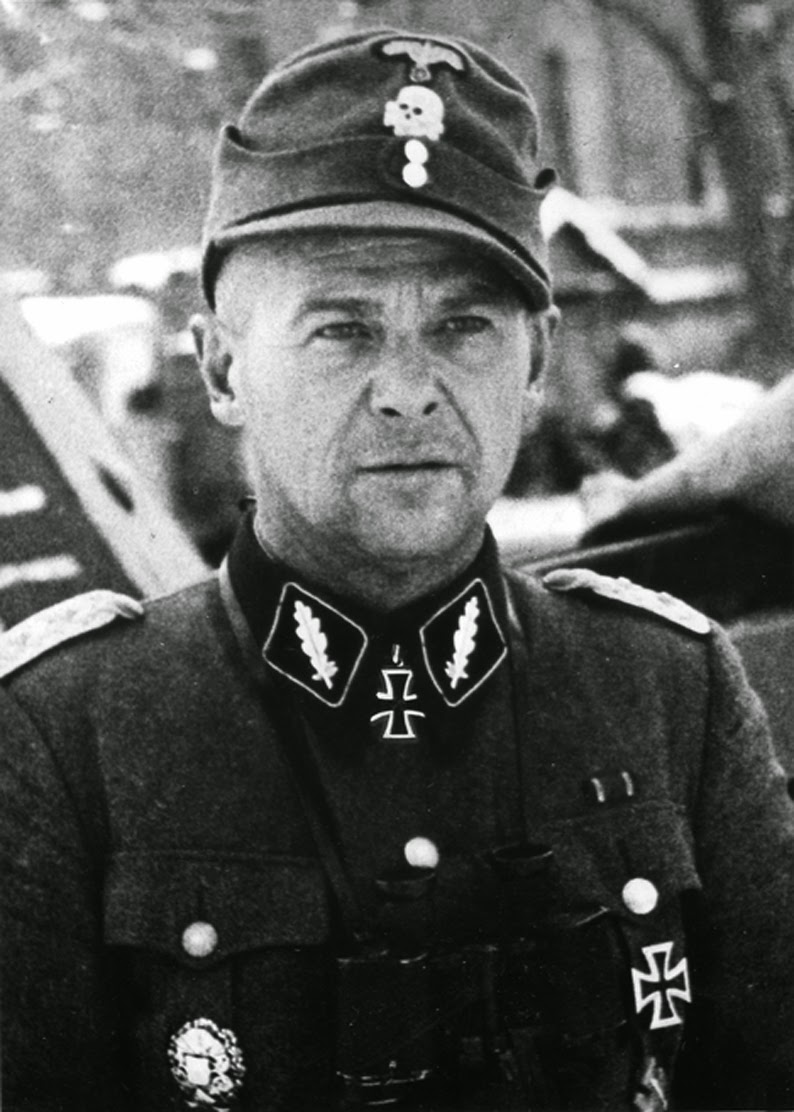
- Born: 7 November 1899; Riga, Russian Empire
- Died: 17 April 1944 (aged 44) Riga, Reichskommissariat Ostland
- Allegiance: Latvia; Nazi Germany
- Branch: Wehrmacht; Waffen-SS
- Service years: 1918–40, 1941–44
- Rank: Standartenführer
- Awards: Knight's Cross of the Iron Cross

Voldemārs Veiss (7 November 1899 – 17 April 1944) was a Latvian officer and prominent Nazi collaborator, who served in the Waffen-SS of Nazi Germany.

When Riga, the capital of Latvia, fell to the Wehrmacht on 1 July 1941, the Germans began forming self-defence and police forces. Veiss was appointed the commander of such a Self Defence organization. On 20 July the Nazis disbanded this organization and ordered the formation of auxiliary police forces instead, with Lt. Col. Veiss being appointed Chief of the Latvian Auxiliary Police. At the end of 1941, he became the First Deputy Director General of the Director General of the Interior when the Latvian Self-Administration was reorganized.

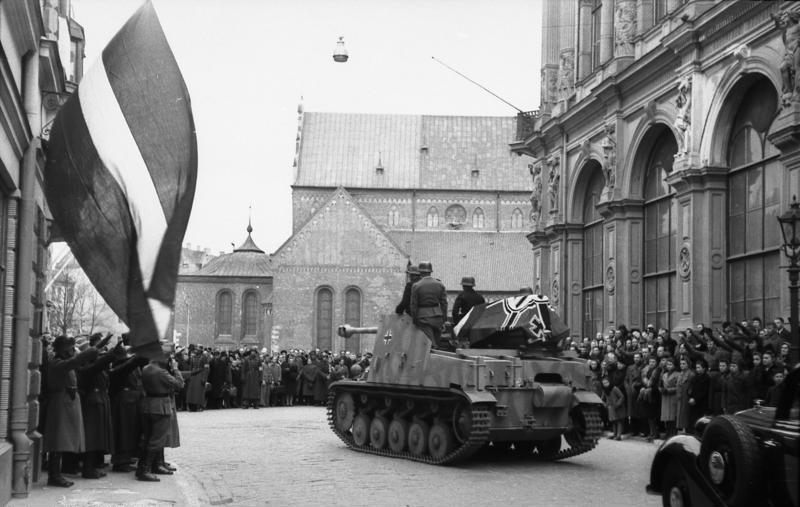
Veiss funeral in Riga

As early as autumn 1941 Latvian auxiliary police units, temporarily attached to the Wehrmacht, were first used in front line duties. This occasional employment continued until the 2nd Latvian Brigade was formed from six Latvian battalions, four of which had combat experience. At the end of April 1943 a three battalion formation fighting under the name of the Latvian Legion was withdrawn from the front line and renamed the 1st Volunteer Regiment of the SS (Latvian), with a change of Wehrmacht ranks to those of the Waffen-SS. Voldemārs Veiss was given command of this regiment, which was a part of the 2nd Latvian Brigade, and received the rank of Legion-Obersturmbannführer. In January 1944, Veiss became the first Latvian to receive the Knight's Cross. On 17 April 1944, Veiss died from wounds he had suffered seven days prior.

== Awards ==
- Knight's Cross of the Iron Cross on 9 February 1944 as Waffen-Standartenführer and commander of SS-Freiwilligen-Grenadier-Regiment 42 (lett. Nr. 4).
