= Aleksandr Dyukov (historian) =

Russian author and blogger

Aleksandr Reshideovich Dyukov Алекса́ндр Решиде́ович Дю́ков
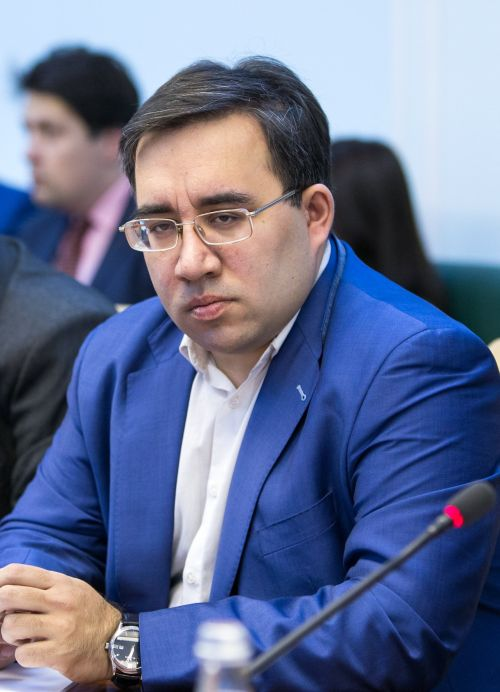
- Born: October 17, 1978 (age 48); Moscow, USSR
- Occupations: Historian, Author
- Known for: Writings on the Soviet Union, German war crimes and Anti-Soviet partisans in the Baltic states

Academic background
- Education: Russian State University for the Humanities

Academic work
- Institutions: Russian Academy of Sciences

Aleksandr Reshideovich Dyukov (Russian: Алекса́ндр Решиде́ович Дю́ков; born October 17, 1978) is a Russian historian, author and blogger. He has written extensively about crimes committed during World War II by Nazi Germany as well as Nazi collaborators in the Baltic states, the post-war activities of anti-Soviet partisans and Soviet deportations of suspect nationalities in the region before, during and after the war.

Dyukov is considered by critics to be a historical negationist downplaying Soviet repressions. He is persona non grata in Latvia, Lithuania and other Schengen member-states.

== Career ==
Aleksandr Dyukov graduated from the Russian State University for the Humanities in 2004. His dissertation focused on the Soviet partisan movement in 1941–1943. From 2004 to 2007, Dyukov worked for the ARMS-TASS Agency of Military and Technical Information. He served as issuing editor of the weekly Military and Technical Cooperation, later promoted to editor-in-chief. He has published two books with the REGNUM News Agency. However, REGNUM has since ended its cooperation with him after a conflict over Dyukov's statements in Russian and Estonian media that his Historical Memory Foundation was primarily responsible for these publications.

Dyukov was a member of the working group set up by the Russian State Duma to prepare a draft law on combating the rehabilitation of Nazism.

== Controversy ==
One of Dyukov's spheres of interest is the history of Soviet repression, mostly in the Baltic states and Ukraine, and more recently, he has written a controversial paper downplaying the massacres at Kurapaty in Belarus. While Dyukov employs open archives such as those from the State Archive of the Russian Federation (GARF) and the Russian State Archive of Contemporary History (RGANI), he also cites the archives of the FSB, to which access by researchers is limited. It is these FSB archives which Dyukov uses, for example, to claim in his recent book, The Genocide Myth, that Estonia's recollection of Soviet repressions, including deportations, is exaggerated. In regard to the June 1941 deportations, which took place before the German invasion on June 22, 1941, Dyukov contends that deported Estonians were mostly German collaborators or were linked to them.

In a 2007 interview with Russia's REGNUM News Agency, Dyukov claimed that some Estonian historians were repeating false claims by the Nazi propaganda and said: "Another example of unfair approach by Estonian official historians is that in describing the deportation of 14 June 1941, they always mention that the deportees were transported in stock cars, with each car stuffed to 40-50 people, including women, children and the elderly. Therefore, they say, this deportation caused massive mortality. However, if we turn to the NKVD documents, a fair amount of which has already been published, one finds that, firstly, the transportation of deportees was carried out in passenger cars 'equipped for summer human traffic.' Secondly, each railroad car carried not 40-50, but about 30 deportees. Third, according to railroad documents, mass death was impossible. It can't be ruled out that during this deportation, not a single person died. Estonian historians, by the way, somehow forget that in every echelon of deportees there was an ambulance railroad car, which was accompanied by a doctor, paramedic and two nurses." In reaction to Dyukov's book, the newspaper Eesti Ekspress in Estonia denounced him as a revisionist historian who paints a picture of Soviet political repressions as "little worse than a family picnic".

Irina Pavlova, a historian of the Soviet system under Lenin and Stalin, has commented that Dyukov promotes "a new prison guard's concept of Soviet history" based on his "blind faith in the documents provided by the FSB archives".

A. Dykov's name has been found mentioned in Estonia's Security Police (Kapo) 2008 yearbook, according to which Dykov, although lacking a post-secondary academic degree, has been granted exclusive access to the FSB (former USSR's KGB) archive. The yearbook claimed that Mr Dykov's activities are approved by Russia's FSB. As of March 2012, Dykov has been prevented from entering Latvia by the Latvian Government, who cited concerns that Dykov's activities are harming the Latvian state and its citizens. According to spokesperson of Latvian Foreign Affairs Ministry, Dykov has been blacklisted in Schengen member states visa database. In August 2014, Dyukov was denied entry into Lithuania.

In response to Dyukov's critique of The Soviet Story, the American photographer of Russian origin Sergey Melnikoff said that Dyukov is associated with the Russian Federal Security Service. Dyukov previously stated that "After watching two thirds of the film, I had only one wish: to kill its director and to burn down the Latvian Embassy."

== Published works ==
=== Books ===
- Дюков, Александр (2007). За что сражались советские люди: "Русский НЕ должен умереть" (in Russian). Moscow: Эксмо, Яуза. ISBN 978-5-699-22722-8. OCLC 181139845. Archived from the original on 28 April 2009.
- Дюков, Александр (2007). Миф о геноциде: Репрессии советских властей в Эстонии (1940–1953) (in Russian). Moscow: Алексей Яковлев. ISBN 978-5-903588-05-3. OCLC 184983972. Archived from the original on 31 March 2009.
- Дюков, Александр (2008). Второстепенный враг: ОУН, УПА и решение "еврейского вопроса" (PDF) (in Russian). Moscow: REGNUM. ISBN 978-5-91150-028-3. OCLC 298927703. Archived from the original (PDF) on 20 August 2008.
- Дюков, Александр (2008). "The Soviet Story": Механизм лжи (PDF) (in Russian). Moscow: REGNUM. ISBN 978-5-91150-029-0. OCLC 316428873. Archived from the original (PDF) on 21 May 2009.
- Дюков, Александр (2008). "The Soviet Story": Механизм лжи / "The Soviet Story": Forgery Tissue (in Russian and English) (2nd ed.). Moscow: Фонд "Историческая память". Archived from the original on 2009-05-18.
- Дюков, Александр (2009). Милость к падшим: Советские репрессии против нацистских пособников в Прибалтике (in Russian). Moscow: Фонд "Историческая память". Archived from the original on 27 April 2009.
- Djukov, A (2009). Deporteerimised Eestis: Kuidas see toimus tegalikult (in Estonian). Tallinn: Tarbeinfo. Archived from the original on 6 October 2011.
- Дюков, Александр (2009). "Пакт Молотова-Риббентропа" в вопросах и ответах (in Russian). Moscow: Фонд "Историческая память". Archived from the original on 30 August 2009.
- Djukov, Alexander (2011). Holokauszt, kollaboráció, megtorlás a Szovjetunió ukrán és balti területei (in Hungarian). Budapest: Russica Pannonicana. ISBN 978-963-7730-61-0.
- Dyukov, Alexander (2012). Divided Eastern Europe: Borders and Population Transfer, 1938-1947. Cambridge: Cambridge Scholars Publishing.
