= Rasony =

Rasony Расоны (Belarusian)
- Urban-type settlement
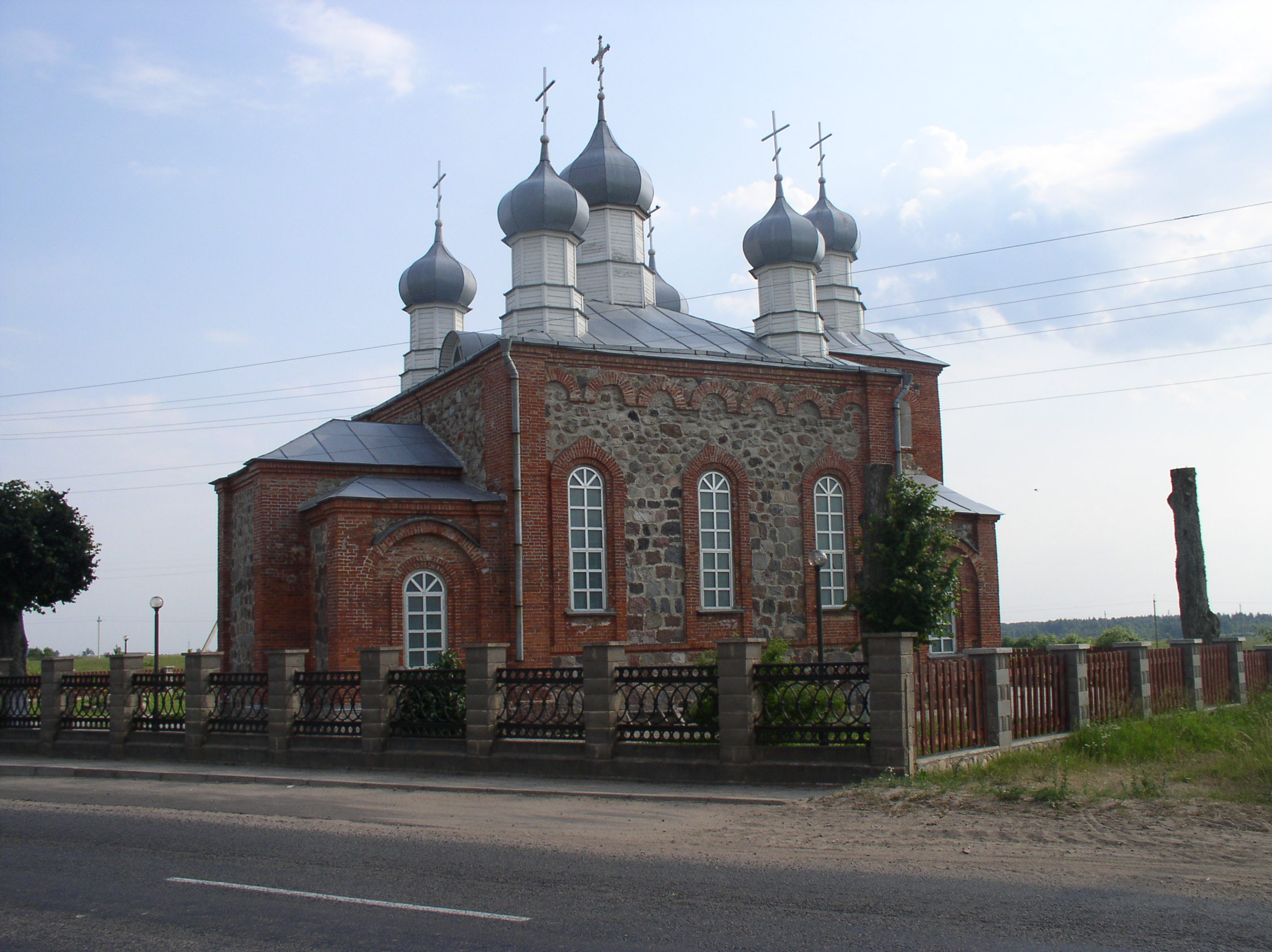
- Churches of the Ascension

- Location within Belarus
- Coordinates: 55°54′15″N 28°48′33″E
- Country: Belarus
- Region: Vitebsk Region
- District: Rasony District

Population (2024)
  - Total: 4,518
- Time zone: UTC+3 (MSK)

Rasony (Belarusian: Расоны; Russian: Россоны, romanized: Rossony) is an urban-type settlement in Vitebsk Region, in northern Belarus. It is located 45 kilometres (28 mi) north of Polotsk, and serves as the administrative center of Rasony District. In 2016, its population was 4,946. As of 2024, it has a population of 4,518.

== History ==
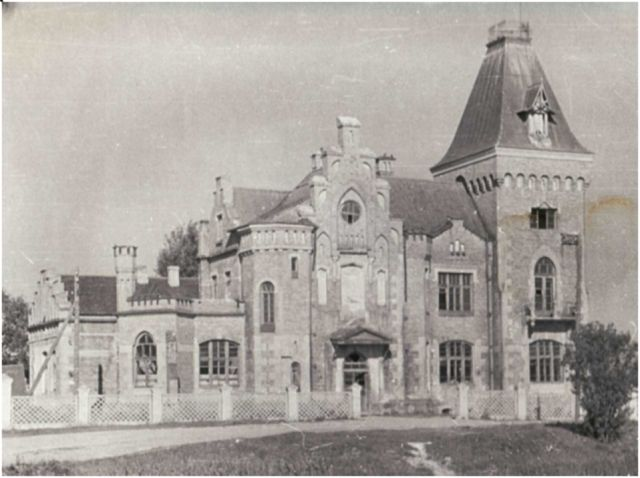
Hłasko Palace in the early 20th century

A Jesuit mission was established in c. 1764. It was a private town of the Lubomirski family. In 1812, it was captured by the French.

At the 1939 Soviet census, Rasony had a Jewish population of 49 people. During World War II, it was under German military occupation from 15 July 1941 until the summer of 1944. The Soviet Extraordinary State Commission estimated in 1945 that there were 488 inmates of the local ghetto, and many of them died before the ghetto was liquidated by the Germans.

== Sights ==
The local landmark is the palace, former seat of the Hłasko family of Leliwa coat of arms.

== Sources ==
- Megargee, Geoffrey P.; Dean, Martin (4 May 2012). The United States Holocaust Memorial Museum Encyclopedia of Camps and Ghettos, 1933 –1945: Volume II: Ghettos in German-Occupied Eastern Europe. Indiana University Press. pp. 1724–1725. ISBN 978-0-253-00202-0.
