= Antoni Leszczewicz =

Belarusian Roman Catholic priest, missionary, and martyr (1890–1943)

Blessed Antoni Leszczewicz MIC
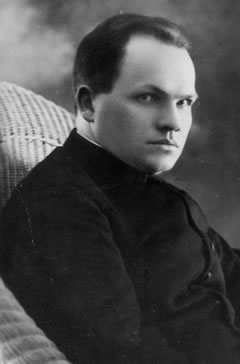
- Born: 30 September 1890; Abramaǔščyna 1, Russian Empire (now Belarus)
- Died: 18 February 1943 (aged 52); Rositsa, Byelorussian SSR, Soviet Union (now Belarus)
- Venerated in: Catholic Church
- Beatified: 13 June 1999, Warsaw by Pope John Paul II
- Feast: 12 June

Antoni Leszczewicz (Belarusian: Антоній Ляшчэвіч, romanized: Antonij Liaščevič; 30 September 1890 – 18 February 1943) was a Polish-Lithuanian Marian Father and Roman Catholic priest. One of the 108 Martyrs of World War II, he was a missionary in China for two decades in the interwar period, later joining the Congregation of Marian Fathers of the Immaculate Conception before being burnt to death in 1943.

Leszczewicz was born on 30 September 1890 in Abramaǔščyna 1 to Jan and Karolina Leszczewicz (née Sadowska). He was educated at a gymnasium in Saint Petersburg, and later studied at a secondary school attached to the Church of St. Catherine. In 1909, he entered the seminary of the Roman Catholic Archdiocese of Mohilev, located in Saint Petersburg. There, he was ordained to the diaconate and was later sent to the Saint Petersburg Roman Catholic Theological Academy for specialized studies. He was ordained a priest on 13 April 1914, either by Wincenty Kluczyński or by Jan Cieplak.

After his ordination, Leszczewicz served as a vicar in Irkutsk for one year, after which he was transferred to Chita in 1915. Beginning in 1920, he worked in the city of Harbin, where he served as vicar for the Church of St. Stanislaus, while also teaching Latin and religion in various Russian and Polish schools. He was made parish provost of the Church of St. Josaphat in 1924, helping to construct its church building and rectory. He also constructed a school for the poor and a day nursery. In 1934, he was awarded the Silver Cross of Merit for his work with Polish emigrants.

In 1937, Leszczewicz left Harbin for Rome, in order to join the Congregation of Marian Fathers of the Immaculate Conception. He underwent his novitiate in Druya, and made his religious vows on 13 June 1939. After the onset of World War II, Leszczewicz was appointed superior for a mission located beyond the Daugava. He was burnt to death on 18 February 1943 in Rositsa as a result of Operation Winterzauber.

He was beatified as one of the 108 Martyrs of World War II by Pope John Paul II in the 1990s.
