= List of terrorist incidents in 1998 =

This is a timeline of incidents in 1998 that have been labelled as "terrorism" and are not believed to have been carried out by a government or its forces (see state terrorism and state-sponsored terrorism).

== Guidelines ==
- To be included, entries must be notable (have a stand-alone article) and described by a consensus of reliable sources as "terrorism".
- List entries must comply with the guidelines outlined in the manual of style under MOS:TERRORIST.
- Casualty figures in this list are the total casualties of the incident including immediate casualties and later casualties (such as people who succumbed to their wounds long after the attacks occurred).
- Casualties listed are the victims. Perpetrator casualties are listed separately (e.g. x (+y) indicate that x victims and y perpetrators were killed/injured).
- Casualty totals may be underestimated or unavailable due to a lack of information. A figure with a plus (+) sign indicates that at least that many people have died (e.g. 10+ indicates that at least 10 people have died) – the actual toll could be considerably higher. A figure with a plus (+) sign may also indicate that over that number of people are victims.
- If casualty figures are 20 or more, they will be shown in **bold**. In addition, figures for casualties more than 50 will also be **underlined**.
- Incidents are limited to one per location per day. If multiple attacks occur in the same place on the same day, they will be merged into a single incident.
- In addition to the guidelines above, the table also includes the following categories:

0 people were killed/injured by the incident.
1–19 people were killed/injured by the incident.
20–49 people were killed/injured by the incident.
50–99 people were killed/injured by the incident.
100+ people were killed/injured by the incident.

== List ==
Date	Type	Dead	Injured	Location	Details	Perpetrators	Part of
25 January	Suicide bombing	17	25	Kandy, Sri Lanka	Four likely members of the Black Tiger squad drove an explosives-laden truck into the Temple of the Tooth, a major Buddhist shrine, killing seventeen and injuring 25.	Black Tiger	Sri Lankan Civil War
25 January	Massacre	23		Jammu and Kashmir, India	23 Hindus are massacred by Lashkar-e-Taiba militants in the town of Wandhama	Lashkar-e-Taiba	Insurgency in Jammu and Kashmir
14 February	Bombings	58	200+	Coimbatore, India	13 bombs exploded over the course of two hours, killing 58 people. The bombs were planted by Islamic extremists from the Al Ummah organization and were meant to target Hindus as well as Hindu nationalist leader L.K. Advani.	Al Ummah	
1-5 March	Assault	64 (+30)	19, 43 Kidnapped (+80)	Caquetá Department, Colombia	An attack in El Billar leaves 64 soldiers dead and 43 kidnapped. Counterguerrilla Battalion No. 52 of Mobile Brigade 3 (153 soldiers) is destroyed.	FARC	Colombian conflict
2/6 April	Bombings	0	0	Riga, Latvia	Latvia's only synagogue, the Peitav Synagogue was bombed. The blast caused extensive damage but did not harm anyone. Four days later the Russian Embassy was bombed. No one was ever convicted but Latvian nationalists are believed to be to have been responsible.	Latvian nationalists (suspected)	
17 April	Massacre	26		Udhampur, India	26 Hindus are massacred by Islamists in Jammu and Kashmir state.	Islamists	Insurgency in Jammu and Kashmir
8 June	Massacre	80		Kabarole, Uganda	+80 students are massacred by ADF militants.	ADF	Allied Democratic Forces insurgency
3 August 8	Massacre	35	11	Chamba district, India	35 Hindus were massacred by Pakistani Islamists in two towns of Himachal Pradesh	Islamists	Insurgency in Jammu and Kashmir
3-4 August	Assault	16	26 (+129 Kidnapped)	Miraflores, Guaviare, Colombia	The FARC attack an anti-drug base, kill 16 police and military personnel and kidnap 129.	FARC	Colombian conflict
7 August	Truck bombings	224	4,000+	Nairobi, Kenya, Dar es Salaam, Tanzania	Two United States Embassies in Nairobi, Kenya and Dar es Salaam, Tanzania were bombed by members of al-Qaeda and the Egyptian Islamic Jihad. 224 people were killed in the blasts (213 in Nairobi, 11 in Dar es Salaam) and over 4,000 people were wounded.	al-Qaeda; EIJ	
15 August	Car bombing	29	220	Omagh, Northern Ireland	A Real IRA bomb with 500lb of explosives detonated in a market place killing 29 people, one woman who was pregnant with twins and injured 220 others.	Real IRA	The Troubles
9 September	Massacre	34-39		Lake Radonjić, Yugoslavia	The Kosovo Liberation Army massacred between 34 and 39 Kosovo Serbs as well as several moderate Albanians	KLA	Kosovo war
29 September	Bombing	55	0	Near Mannar District, Sri Lanka	Lionair Flight 602 disappeared off the coast of Mannar District shortly after leaving Kankesanturai Airport in Jaffna. The LTTE had issued warning shortly before the plane disappeared. The wreckage of the plane was discovered in October 2012 and appeared to have been bombed.	LTTE	Sri Lankan Civil War
3 October	Kidnapping	4		Grozny, Russia	About 20 Chechen separatists kidnapped four engineers, three British and one New Zealander. The bodies of the engineers were found on 8 December.	Chechen separatists	Terrorism in Russia
18 October	Bombing	84	30	Machuca, Segovia, Colombia	The Machuca massacre was an attack by the National Liberation Army (ELN) in Antioquia) that saw the dynamiting of a pipeline, which caused a fire and spread to the town. 46 houses were burned, 84 people died and 30 people survived. Half the victims were minors.	ELN	Colombian Conflict
14 December	Massacre	6	15	Peć, Yugoslavia	Two men believed to be members of the Kosovo Liberation Army opened fire on café and killed six young Serb men and wounded 15 others.	KLA	Kosovo war
28-29 December	Kidnapping, shootout	4 (+2)	2 (+10 kidnapped)	Abyan Governorate, Yemen	Militants attacked a convoy of western tourists, kidnapping 16 and taking them to a remote hideout. The following day, Yemeni forces raided the hideout, resulting in a shootout where three militants were killed. Four hostages were also killed and two were injured.	Aden-Abyan Islamic Army	

== See also ==
- List of terrorist incidents
