= History of the Jews in Latvia =

Latvian Jews
Latvijas ebreji יהדות לטביה

Regions with significant populations
- Latvia: 8,094 (2021, including Karaim and Krymchaks)

Languages
- Hebrew, Russian, Latvian, German (historically), and Yiddish

Religion
- Judaism

Related ethnic groups
- Jews, Ashkenazi Jews, Belarusian Jews, Russian Jews, Lithuanian Jews, Estonian Jews, Polish Jews

The location of Latvia (dark green) in Europe

The history of the Jews in Latvia dates back to the first Jewish colony established in Piltene in 1571. Jews contributed to Latvia's development until the Northern War (1700–1721), which decimated Latvia's population. The Jewish community reestablished itself in the 18th century, mainly through an influx from Prussia, and came to play a principal role in the economic life of Latvia.

Under an independent Latvia, Jews formed political parties and participated as members of parliament. The Jewish community flourished. Jewish parents had the right to send their children to schools using Hebrew as the language of instruction, as part of a significant network of minority schools.

World War II ended the prominence of the Jewish community. Under Joseph Stalin, Jews, who formed only 5% of the population, constituted 12% of the deportees. 80% of Latvia's Jewish population was murdered in the Holocaust.

Today's Jewish community traces its roots to survivors of the Holocaust, Jews who fled to the USSR's interior to escape the German invasion and later returned, and mostly to Jews newly immigrated to Latvia from the Soviet Union. The Latvian Jewish community today is small but active.

== General history ==
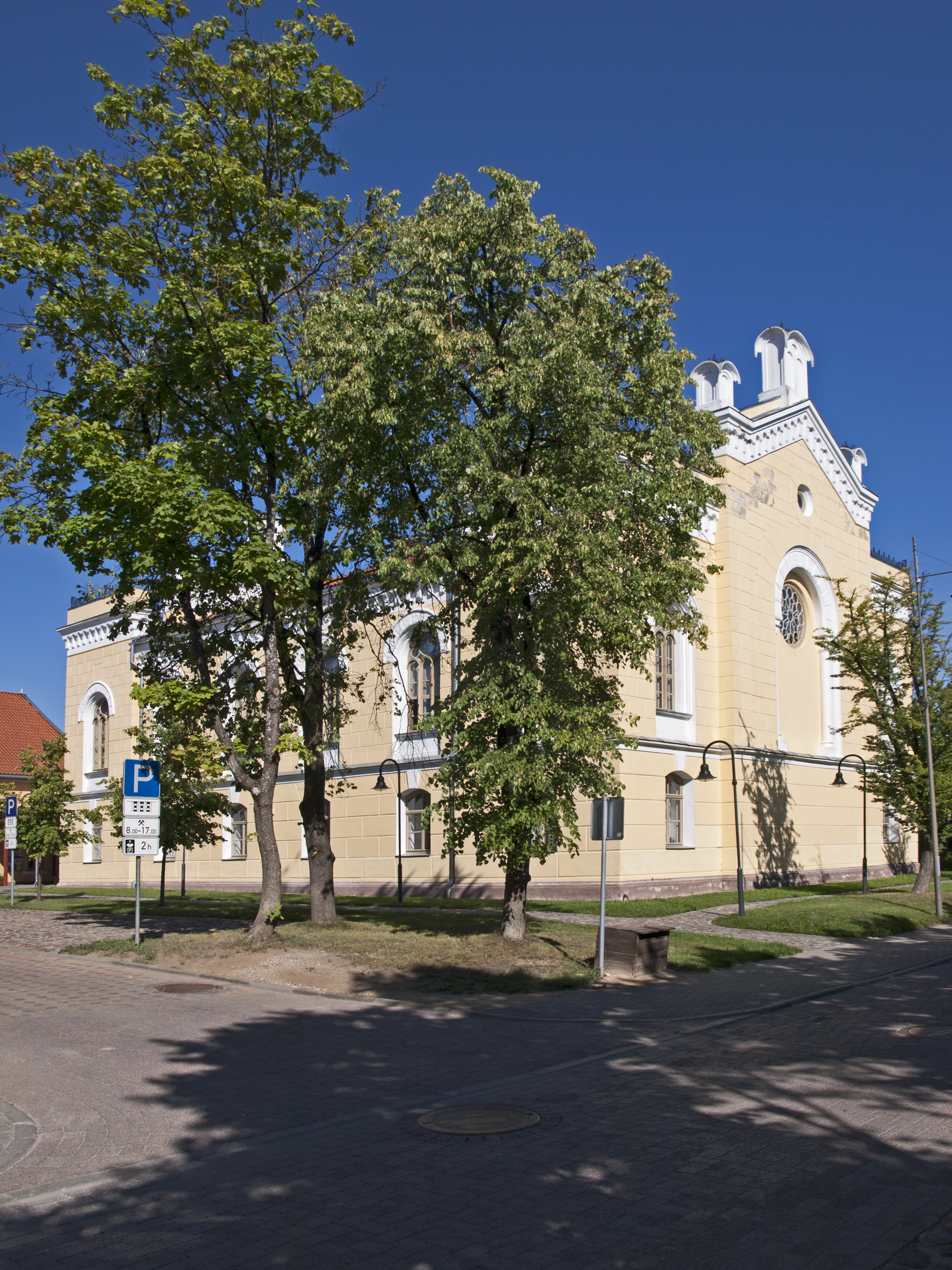
Former synagogue in Kuldīga

The ancient Latvian tribes had no connections with the Jews and their entrance was banned into Livonia. (Note: The Grand Master of the Teutonic Order, Siegfried von Feuchtwangen, banned Jews from entering Livonia in 1306 (or 1309), which implied that the Jews created competition for German merchants. In the next few centuries, Jews possibly came to Livonia as authorized merchants from other countries and cities, but did not settle in Livonia for a long life.) Nevertheless, occasional records attest to the presence of individual Jews: a 14th-century tombstone near Jelgava and a 1536 reference to a Jewish merchant named Jacob in Riga suggest limited activity, often by Jews with special privileges or ties to rulers of German lands, as Livonia was part of the Holy Roman Empire.

Only after the Livonian War in the second half of the 16th century, when the lands of Latvia became the subject to Denmark, Poland and Lithuania, Jews began to arrive in the territory of Latvia. First was the Duchy of Courland, where there formed a Jewish community near modern day Piltene and Aizpute after 1570. In the 17th century large numbers of Jews arrived in the Duchy of Courland that was a vassal of the King of Poland. The Jews were entrusted with the offices of tax-collectors, money-changers and merchants. They facilitated Duke Jacob Ketler's (1610–1681) economic reforms. Attempts of the conservative landowners to banish the Jews failed. In 18th century, Duke Ernst Johann von Biron and his father Peter von Biron had a benevolent attitude toward the Jews. A great role in the modernization of Courland was achieved by finance assistant court Jew Aaron Levi Lipman (served until 1741), upon whose request many craftsmen, doctors and teachers of Jewish extraction came to Courland. They brought the idea of emancipation of the Jews - Haskalah, with them. Jews also took part in the building of the Duke's palaces in Rundāle and Jelgava. In 1793, the Jews in Jelgava expressed their gratitude to Duke Peter von Biron for the protection of Jews and religious tolerance.

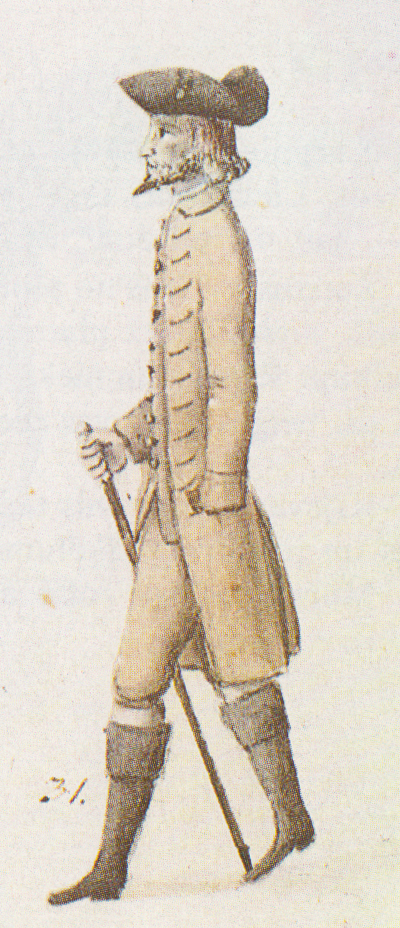
A German Jew, drawn by Johann Christoph Brotze during his time in the territory of modern-day Latvia.

In the Eastern part of Latvia, Latgale, Jews came from Ukraine, Belarus and Poland in the 17th and 18th centuries, of whom most belonged to the Polish culture of Yiddish. A large part of their community life was managed by the kahal (self-government). In the 17th and 18th centuries, Jews were not permitted to stay in Riga or Vidzeme. During the reign of Catherine II from 1766 onwards, Jewish merchants were allowed to stay in Riga for six months, provided they lived in a particular block of the city. In 1785, the Jews of Sloka were allowed a temporary stay in Riga for a longer period of time.

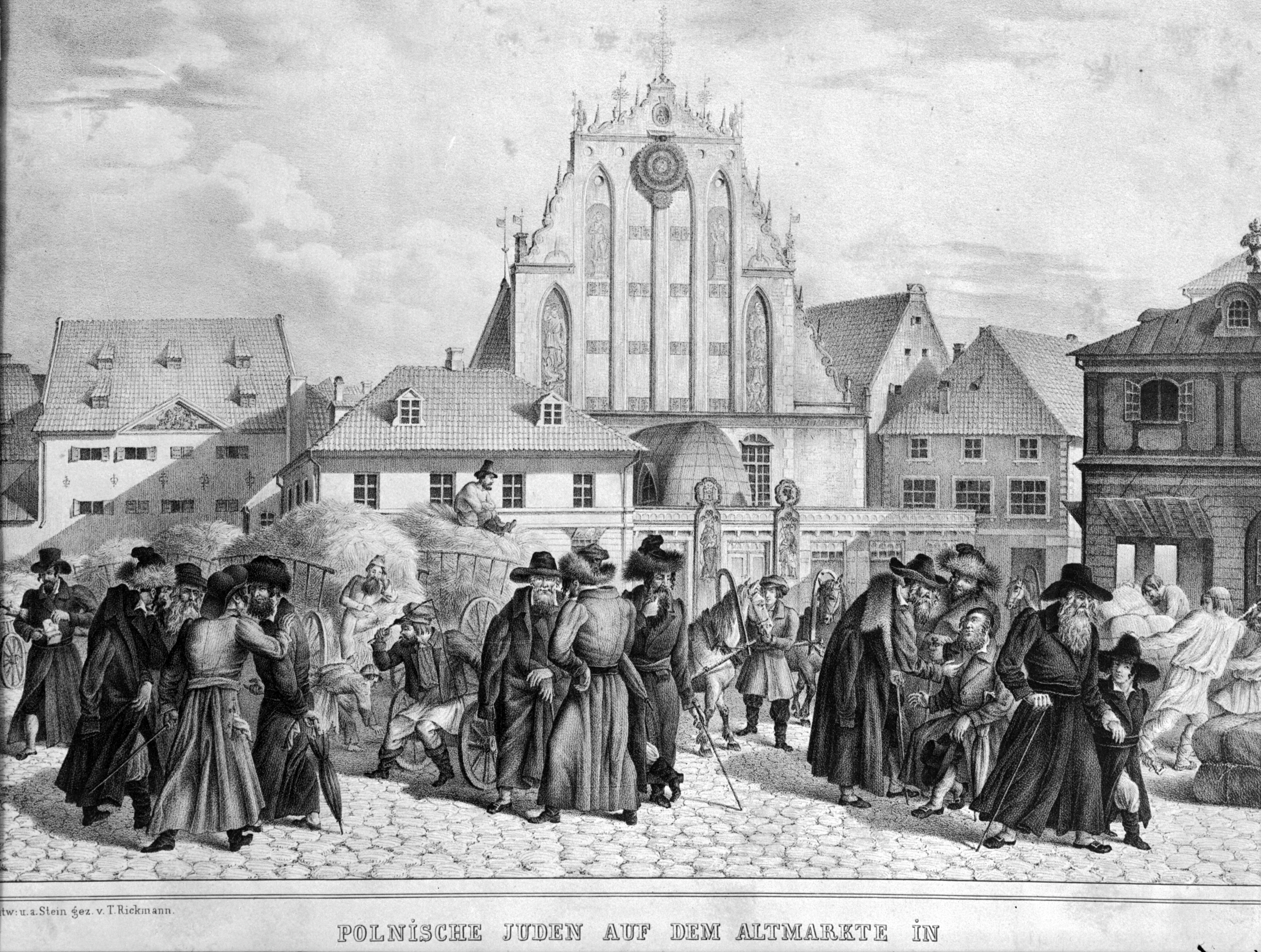
Polish Jews at the Old Market in Riga, 1842. House of Blackheads in the background

== Jewish population in the Latvian Republic ==
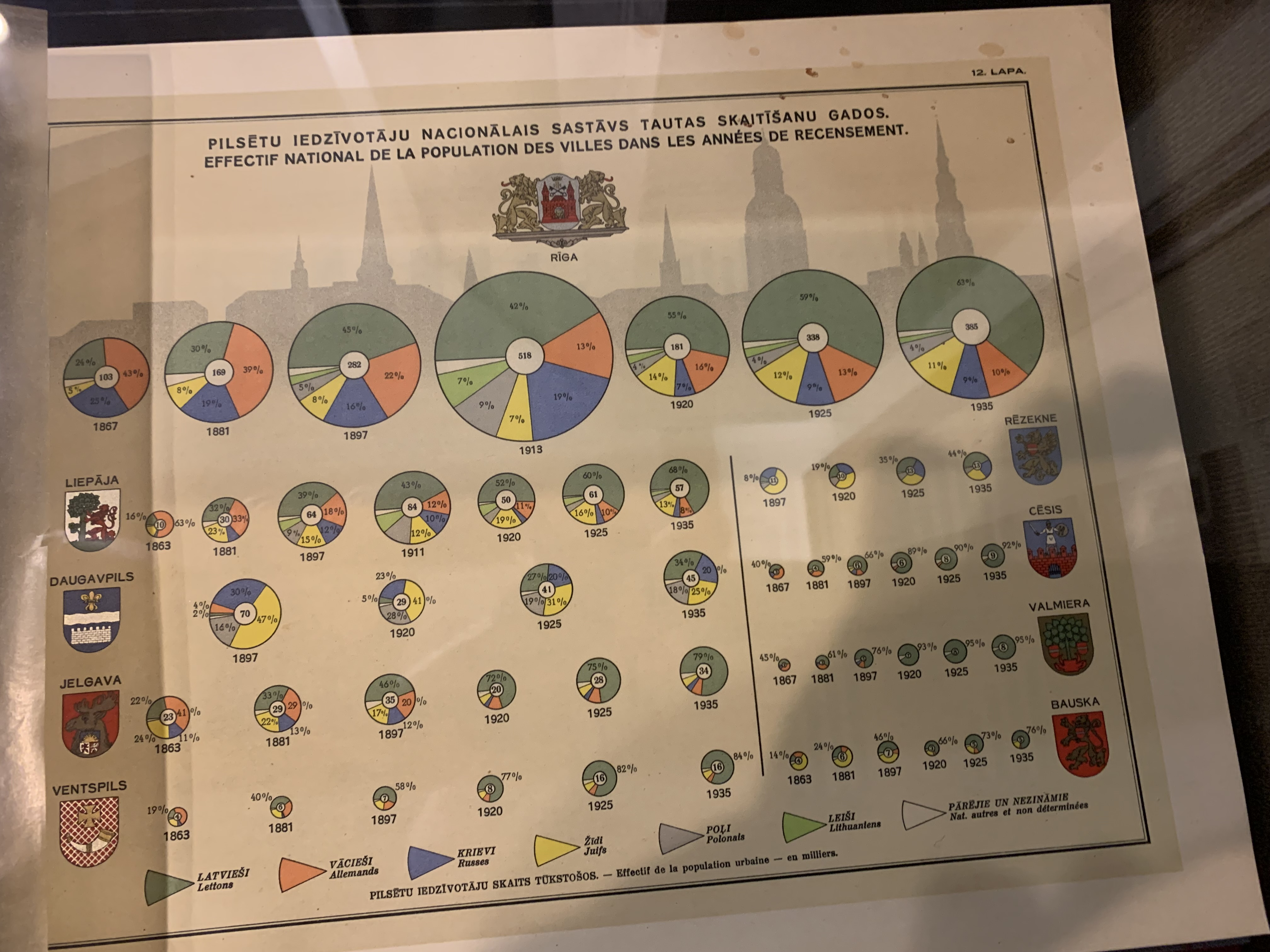
Ethnic composition of Latvia from 1863 to 1935. The towns of Rezekne, Daugavpils and Bauska in particular had large Jewish populations.

During the World War I in 1914, there were about 190,000 Jews in the territories of Latvia (7.4% of the total population). In 1920 the Jews of Latvia numbered 79,644 (5% of the population). After the signing of the peace treaty between the Latvian Republic and the Soviet Union on August 11, 1920, repatriates began to return from Russia; these included a considerable number of Jewish refugees. In this time, there were 40,000 Jews in Riga alone.

=== Economic life ===
Jews already played an important role in industry, commerce, and banking before World War I. After the establishment of the republic, a severe crisis overtook the young state. The government had not yet consolidated itself and the country had become impoverished as a result of World War I and the struggle for independence which Latvia had conducted for several years (1918–20) against both Germany and the Soviet Union. With the cessation of hostilities, Latvia found itself insufficient in both the administrative and economic spheres. Among other difficulties, there was running inflation. Jews made a large contribution to the rebuilding of the state from the ruins of the war and its consequences. Having much experience in the export of the raw materials of timber and linen before World War I, upon their return from Russia they resumed export of these goods on their own initiative. They also developed a variegated industry, and a considerable part of the import trade, such as that of petrol, coal, and textiles, was concentrated in their hands. However, once the Jews had made their contribution, the authorities began to force them out of their economic positions and to deprive them of their sources of livelihood.

Although, in theory, there were no discriminatory laws against the Jews in democratic Latvia and they enjoyed equality of rights, in practice the economic policy of the government was intended to restrict their activities. This was also reflected in the area of credit. The Jews of Latvia developed a ramified network of loan banks for the granting of credit with the support of the American Jewish Joint Distribution Committee and the Jewish Colonization Association (JCA).

=== Public and political life ===
Seats won by Jewish political parties in elections during the first Republic of Latvia
Party		Constituent Assembly (1920)	First Saeima 1922	Second Saeima 1925	Third Saeima 1928	Fourth Saeima 1931
Agudas Israel		–	2	2	1	2
Bundists		–	1	1	1	–
Jewish Democratic Bloc		–	–	–	0	–
Jewish Economic Bloc		–	–	–	0	–
Jewish National Bloc	Histadruth-Hacionith	5	2	0	–	–
Jewish National Bloc	Jewish National Democratic Party	5	2	0	–	–
Jewish National Bloc	Mizrachi	5	2	1	2	1
Jewish People's Party		–	0	–	–	–
Jewish Progressive Association		–	–	–	–	0
Jews of Ludza		0	–	–	–	–
Ceire Cion		1	1	1	1	–
United List of Zemgale Jews		–	–	–	–	0

Jewish parliamentary representatives, first Republic of Latvia
Saeima	Representatives	Fraction (frakcija)
2nd	Mordehajs (Morduhs) Dubins, Maksis Lazersons, Mordehajs Markuss Nuroks, Ruvins Vitenbergs	Jewish
2nd	Noijs Maizels	Jewish social-democratic "Bund"

=== Culture and education ===
On December 8, 1919, the general bill on schools was passed by the People's Council of Latvia; this coincided with the bill on the cultural autonomy of the minorities. In the Ministry of Education, there were special departments for the minorities. The engineer Jacob Landau (Jakobs Landau) headed the Jewish department.

After the Ulmanis coup d’état of May 15, 1934, restrictions were placed on the autonomy of minorities' "cultures and minorities" education as well as education in native language. This was part of a wider move to standardize Latvian usage in schooling and professional and governmental sectors. As a result, Jewish schools continue to operate while secular Yiddish schools were closed. This resulted in the works of eminent Jewish authors such as the poet Hayim Nahman Bialik (Latvian: Haims Nahmans Bjaliks) and historian Simon Dubnow (Latvian: Šimons Dubnovs) being removed from the Jewish curriculum.

All political parties and organizations were also abolished. Of Jewish groups, only Agudat Israel continued to operate. Jewish social life did, however, retain its vitality. Owing in part to the restrictions imposed on minorities including Jews, the influence of religion and Zionism increased, motivating some to immigrate to Palestine. This also increased the influence of the banned Social Democrats, while the Jewish intelligentsia gravitated toward Zionism.

== World War II ==
=== Soviet occupation, 1940–1941 ===
After first extracting Latvian agreement under duress—Stalin personally threatened the Latvian foreign minister, in Moscow, during negotiations—to the stationing of Soviet troops on Latvian soil, the Soviet Union invaded Latvia on June 16, 1940. Jewish civic and political leaders began to be arrested in August 1940. The first to be arrested were the Zionist leaders Favid Varhaftig and Mahanud Alperin. The leadership of Betar were deported. In 1941, the Soviets arrested Nuroks, Dubins and other Jewish civic leaders, Zionists, conservatives, and right wing socialists. Their arrest orders were approved by S. Shustin. When the Soviets executed the first round of mass Baltic deportations, on the night of June 13–14, 1941, thousands of Latvian Jews were deported along with Latvians. Of all the ethnic groups so deported, Jews suffered proportionately more than any other, and were deported to especially harsh conditions. Records have been preserved of the deportations of 1,212 Jewish Latvian citizens (12.5% of those deported to the far reaches of the USSR) but the actual number of Jews deported was certainly larger, on the order of 5,000 to 6,000 during the first Soviet occupation.

The deportations of Jewish civic leaders and rabbis, members of parliament, and the professional and merchant class only a week before Nazi Germany invaded the Baltics left the Jewish community ill-prepared to organize in the face of the invasion and immediately ensuing Holocaust. Those deported included Constitutional Convention members Īzaks Rabinovičs and Īzaks Berss, 1st and 3rd Saeima deputy and head of the Bund Noijs Maizels, as well as other Jewish members of parliament. Men were separated from their families and sent to labor camps at Solikamsk (in Perm), Vyatka, and Vorkuta, while their wives and children were sent to Novosibirsk, Krasnoyarsk, and elsewhere. Approximately half died as the consequence of their deportation, some deported more than once—Mordehai Dubin died after being deported a second time in 1956.

It is estimated that of the 2,100,000 Jews who came under Soviet control as a result of Molotov–Ribbentrop Pact dividing Eastern Europe, about 1,900,000 were deported to Siberia and central Asia.

=== German occupation of Latvia, 1941–1944 ===
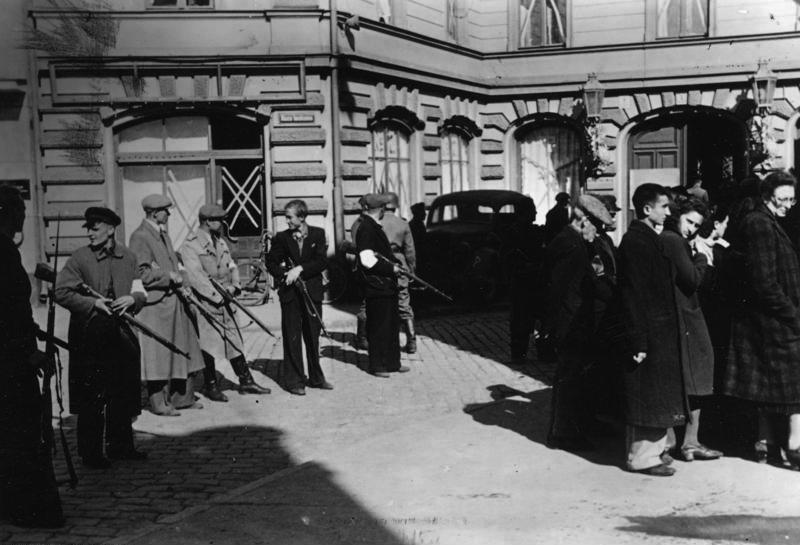
Members of Latvian Auxiliary Police assemble a group of Jews, Liepāja, July 1941

Latvia was occupied by the Germans during the first weeks of the German-Soviet war in July 1941. It became part of the new Reichskommissariat "Ostland", officially designated as "Generalbezirk Lettland". Otto-Heinrich Drechsler was appointed its commissioner general, with headquarters in Riga, the seat of the Reich Commissioner for Ostland, Hinrich Lohse. At the end of July 1941 the Germans replaced the military with a civil administration. One of its first acts was the promulgation of a series of anti-Jewish ordinances. A subordinate civil administration composed of local collaborationist elements was also established, to which Latvian general councillors were appointed. Their nominal head was Oskars Dankers, a former Latvian army general.

In mid-June 1941, on the eve of Hitler's attack on the Soviet Union, 14,000 citizens of Latvia, including several thousand Jews, were deported by the Soviet authorities to Siberia and other parts of Soviet Asia as politically undesirable elements. During the Nazi attack of Latvia a considerable number of Jews also succeeded in fleeing to the interior of the Soviet Union; it is estimated that some 75,000 Latvian Jews fell into Nazi hands. Survivor accounts sometimes describe how, even before the Nazi administration began persecuting the Latvian Jews, they had suffered from antisemitic excesses at the hands of the Latvian activists, although there is some disagreement amongst Jewish historians as to the extent of this phenomenon. Latvian-American Holocaust historian Andrew (Andrievs) Ezergailis argues that there was no "interregnum" period at all in most parts of Latvia, when Latvian activists could have engaged in the persecution of Jews on their own initiative. The Einsatzgruppen ("task forces") played a leading role in the destruction of Latvian Jews, according to information given in their own reports, especially in the report of SS-Brigadeführer (General) Stahlecker, the commander of Einsatzgruppe A, whose unit operated on the northern Russian front and in the occupied Baltic republics. His account covers the period from the end of June up to October 15, 1941.

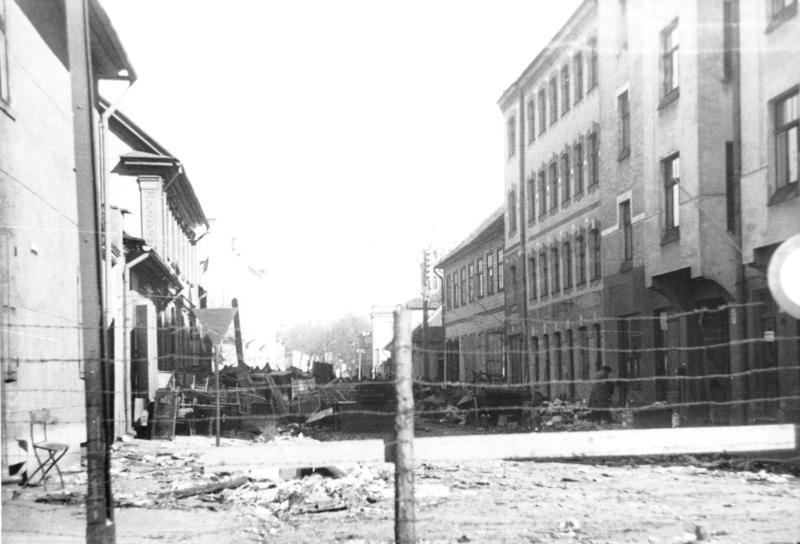
The Riga Ghetto in 1942, after the Rumbula massacre

Nevertheless, the Latvian Arajs Kommando played a leading role in the atrocities committed in the Riga Ghetto in conjunction with the Rumbula massacre on November 30, 1941. One of the most notorious members of the group was Herberts Cukurs. After the war, surviving witnesses reported that Cukurs had been present during the ghetto clearance and fired into the mass of Jewish civilians. According to another account Cukurs also participated in the burning of the Riga synagogues. According to Bernard Press in his book The Murder of the Jews in Latvia, Cukurs burned the synagogue on Stabu Street.

At the instigation of the Einsatzgruppe, the Latvian Auxiliary Police carried out a pogrom against the Jews in Riga. All synagogues were destroyed and 400 Jews were killed. According to Stahlecker's report, the number of Jews killed in mass executions by Einsatzgruppe A by the end of October 1941 in Riga, Jelgava (Mitau), Liepāja (Libau), Valmiera (Wolmar), and Daugavpils (Dvinsk) totaled 30,025, and by the end of December 1941, 35,238 Latvian Jews had been killed; 2,500 Jews remained in the Riga Ghetto and 950 in the Daugavpils ghetto. At the end of 1941 and the beginning of 1942, Jews deported from Germany, Austria, Czechoslovakia, and other German-occupied countries began arriving in Latvia. Some 15,000 "Reich Jews" were settled in several streets of the liquidated "greater Riga ghetto". Many transports were taken straight from the Riga railroad station to execution sites in the Rumbula and Biķernieki forests near Riga, and elsewhere. In 1942 about 800 Jews from Kaunas Ghetto (in Lithuania) were brought to Riga and some of them participated in the underground organization in the Riga ghetto.

The German occupying power in Latvia also kept Jews in "barracks camps", i.e., near their places of forced labor. A considerable number of such camps were located in the Riga area and other localities. Larger concentrations camps included those at Salaspils and Kaiserwald (Mežaparks). The Salaspils concentration camp, set up at the end of 1941, contained thousands of people, including many Latvian and foreign Jews.

Conditions in this camp, one of the worst in Latvia, led to heavy loss of life among the inmates. The Kaiserwald concentration camp, established in the summer of 1943, contained the Jewish survivors from the ghettos of Riga, Daugavpils, Liepāja, and other places, as well as non-Jews. At the end of September 1943 Jews from the liquidated Vilna Ghetto (in Lithuania) were also taken to Kaiserwald. When the Soviet victories in the summer of 1944 forced a German retreat from the Baltic states, the surviving inmates of the Kaiserwald camp were deported by the Germans to Stutthof concentration camp near Danzig, and from there were sent to various other camps.

== War crimes trials ==
On April 7, 1945, the Soviet press published the "Declaration of the Special Government Commission charged with the inquiry into the crimes committed by the German-Fascist aggressors during their occupation of the Latvian Socialist Soviet Republic". This document devotes a chapter to the persecution and murder of Jews. The declaration lists Nazis held responsible for the crimes committed in Latvia under German occupation. They include Hinrich Lohse, the Reich Commissioner for Ostland; Friedrich Jeckeln, chief of police (HSSPF) for Ostland; Otto-Heinrich Drechsler, Commissioner General for Latvia; Rudolf Lange, chief of the security police; Kurt Krause, chief of the Riga ghetto and commandant of the Salaspils concentration camp; Max Gymnich, his assistant; Albert Sauer, commandant of the Kaiserwald concentration camp; and several dozen other Nazi criminals involved in the destruction of Latvian Jewry. On January 26, 1946, the military tribunal of the Baltic Military District began a trial of a group of Nazi war criminals, among them Jeckeln, one of the men responsible for the Rumbula massacre at the end of 1941. He and six others were sentenced to death by hanging; the sentence was carried out in Riga on February 3, 1946. Other trials were held in the postwar Latvian SSR, but altogether only a small number of Germans and Latvians who had taken part in the murder of Latvian Jewry were brought to justice.

Latvians of varying backgrounds also took part in the persecution and murder of the Jews in the country outside Latvia. At the time of the German retreat in the summer of 1944, many of these collaborators fled to Germany. After the war, as assumed Displaced Persons, they received aid from UNRRA, from the International Refugee Organization (IRO), and other relief organizations for Nazi victims, and some of them immigrated to the U.S. and other countries abroad. On the other hand, there were also Latvians who risked their lives in order to save Jews. One such, Jānis Lipke, helped to save several dozen Jews of the Riga ghetto by providing them with hideouts.

== Developments 1970–1991 ==
The Jewish population of Latvia declined from 28,300 in 1979 to 22,900 in 1989, when 18,800 of its Jews lived in the capital Riga. Part of this was due to a high rate of emigration to Israel; the Soviet Union allowed limited numbers of Jewish citizens to leave the country for Israel every year. Between 1968 and 1980, 13,153 Jews, or 35.8% of the Jewish population of Latvia, emigrated to Israel or other Western countries.

In 1989, there were 22,900 Jews in Latvia, who comprised some 0.9% of the population. That same year Soviet Union allowed unrestricted Jewish immigration, and 1,588 Jews emigrated from Latvia (1,536 of them from Riga). In 1990, 3,388 Latvian Jews immigrated to Israel (2,837 of them from Riga). In 1991, the number of immigrants to Israel from Riga was 1,087. That same year, the Soviet Union collapsed, and Latvia regained its independence. Immigration continued throughout the 1990s, causing a decline in the Jewish population. According to the Jewish Agency, 12,624 Jews and non-Jewish family members of Jews immigrated from Latvia to Israel between 1989 and 2000. Some Latvian Jews also emigrated to other Western countries. Many of these emigrants kept their Latvian citizenship.

After the fall of the Soviet Union and Latvian independence in 1991, many Jews who arrived from the Soviet Union were denied automatic Latvian citizenship, as with anyone of any nationality who was not a Latvian citizen, or descendant of one, until the Soviet occupation of Latvia in 1940. This included children and grandchildren who were born in Latvia, as per Latvian law citizenship is not determined by place of birth, but by having an ancestor who is a national or citizen of the state. In public school, the compulsory use of Latvian affected many Jewish students, who spoke Russian as their primary language. As Latvia sought to become a member of the European Union, its citizenship requirements were gradually relaxed in the 1990s, allowing for its postwar residents to apply for Latvian citizenship.

July 4 was established in Latvia as a memorial day for the victims of the Holocaust.

== In independent Latvia ==
On June 11–17, 1993, the First World Congress of Latvian Jews was held in Riga. It was attended by delegates from Israel, the US, Sweden, Switzerland, Germany, Britain, South Africa, and Australia.

Two desecrations of Holocaust memorials, in Jelgava and in the Biķernieki Forest, took place in 1993. The delegates of the World Congress of Latvian Jews who came to Biķernieki to commemorate the 46,500 Latvian Jews shot there, were shocked by the sight of swastikas and the word Judenfrei daubed on the memorial. Articles of antisemitic content appeared in the Latvian fringe nationalist press. The main topics of these articles were the collaboration of Jews with the Communists in the Soviet period, Jews tarnishing Latvia's good name in the West, and Jewish businessmen striving to control the Latvian economy.

In the early 2000s, after a decade of mass emigration, around 9,000 Jews remained in Latvia, mostly in Riga, where an Ohr Avner Chabad school was in operation. Ohel Menachem also operated a day school, as well as a kindergarten. An active synagogue, the Peitav Synagogue, operates in the Old City of Riga. The main Holocaust memorial in Riga was built in 1993 on the site of the destroyed Grand Choral Synagogue, with another one commemorating the events in Biķernieki (built 2001), the Rumbula massacre (built 2002) and the Kaiserwald concentration camp in Sarkandaugava (built 2005). The main Jewish cemetery, the New (Šmerlis) Cemetery, is located on the city's eastern side in Lizuma Street in Jugla. Elsewhere in Latvia, the Daugavpils Synagogue is still in operation, with a new synagogue opened in Jūrmala and the ones in Rēzekne and Ludza restored as museums. One of the largest memorials outside Riga is located at the Šķēde Dunes in Liepāja.

In 2023, a mass grave of dozens of Jews slain by Nazis in 1941 was found in Liepāja. A mass grave of around 30 Latvian Jews killed in 1941 near Baldone along the Baldone–Daugmale road was researched in June 2022, and the remains later reburied.

== Historical demographics ==
Historical Latvian Jewish population
Year	Pop.	±%
1925	95,675	—
1939	95,600	−0.1%
1941	70,000	−26.8%
1959	50,000	−28.6%
1970	43,000	−14.0%
1979	28,338	−34.1%
1989	22,925	−19.1%
2002	9,600	−58.1%
2011	6,454	−32.8%
2021	8,094	+25.4%
Source: The Jewish population data includes Mountain Jews (recorded as Tats in Soviet censuses), Georgian Jews, Bukharan Jews (or Central Asian Jews), and Krymchaks (all per the 1959 Soviet census).

== Bibliography ==
- M. Schatz-Anin, Di Yidn in Letland (1924)
- L. Ovchinski, Geschikhte fun di Yidn in Letland (1928)
- I. Morein, 15 Yor Letland 1918–1933 (1933)
- Yahadut Latvia, Sefer Zikkaron (1953)
- M. Bobe, Perakim be-Toledot Yahadut Latvia (1965)
- M. Kaufmann, Die Vernichtung der Juden Lettlands (1947)
- Jewish Central Information Office, London, From Germany to the Riga Ghetto (1945)
- Isaac Levinson, The Untold Story (1958)
- J. Gar, in: Algemeyne Entsiklopedie (1963)
- Gerald Reitlinger, The Final Solution (1968)
- Raul Hilberg, The Destruction of the European Jews (1967)
- U. Schmelz and Sergio Della Pergola in AJYB, (1995)
- Supplement to the Monthly Bulletin of Statistics, 2, (1995)
- Antisemitism World Report 1994, London: Institute of Jewish Affairs, 141–142
- Antisemitism World Report 1995, London: Institute of Jewish Affairs, 163–164
- Mezhdunarodnaia Evreiskaia Gazeta (MEG) (1993)
- Dov Levin (ed.), Pinkas Hakehilot, Latvia and Estonia (1988)

== Notes and references ==
=== References ===
Significant portions of this article were reproduced, with permission of the publisher, from the forthcoming Encyclopaedia Judaica, Second Edition.

== See also ==
- General Jewish Labour Bund in Latvia
- History of the Jews during World War II
- History of the Jews in Estonia
- History of the Jews in Lithuania
- Jews in Latvia (museum)
- Kaiserwald concentration camp
- Latvian resistance movement
- Military history of Latvia during World War II
- Occupation of Latvia by Nazi Germany
- Reichskommissariat Ostland
- Rumbula
- Sorella Epstein
