= Tamāra Zitcere =

Latvian scientist and historian (1947–2014)

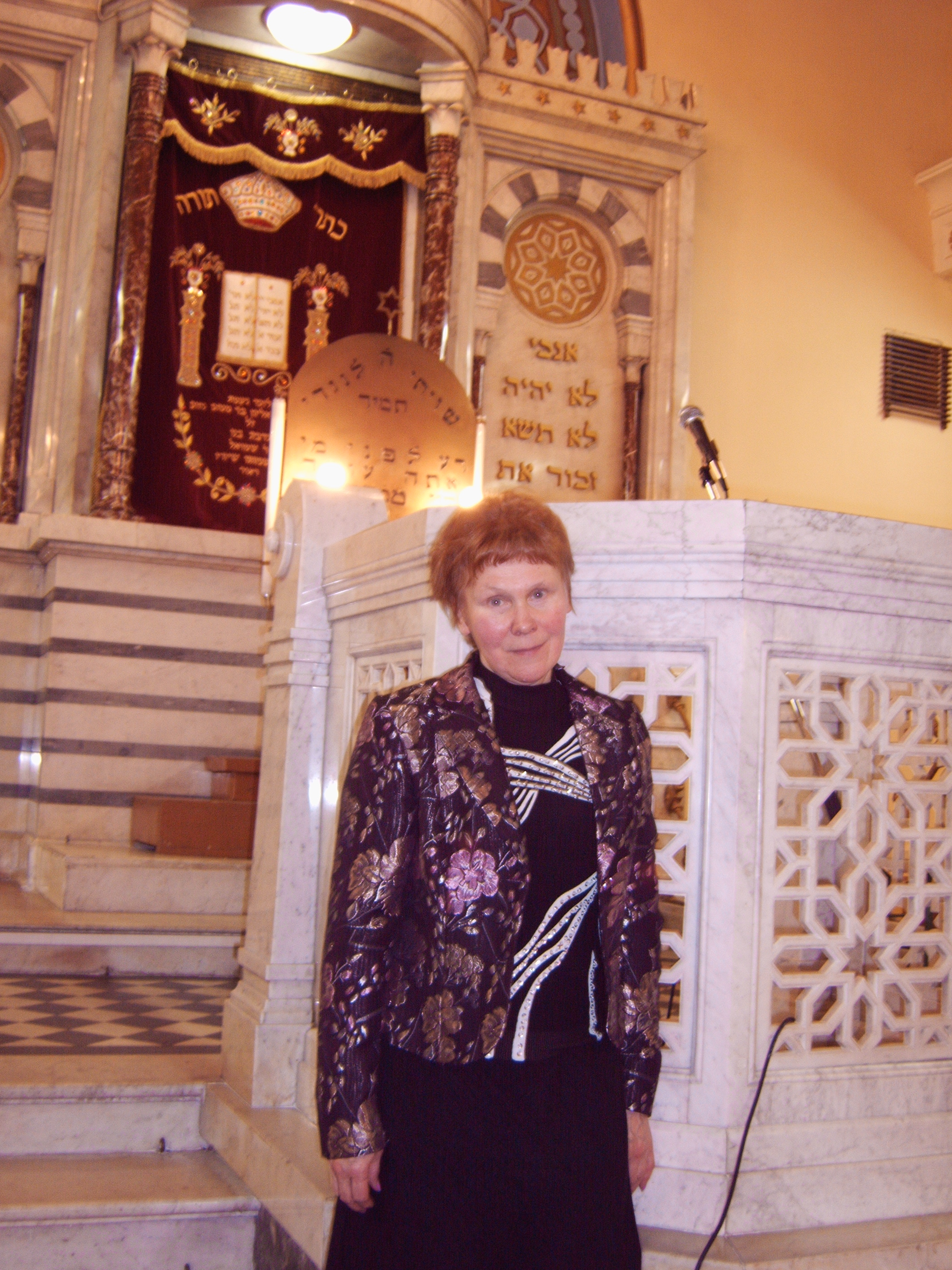
- Tamāra Zitcere in Peitav Synagogue in 2005
- Born: 2 December 1947; Riga, Latvian SSR, Soviet Union
- Died: 25 July 2014 (aged 66); Riga, Latvia
- Burial place: Forest Cemetery, Riga

Tamāra Zitcere (December 2, 1947 – July 25, 2014) was a Latvian scientist, Holocaust researcher and teacher. She is one of the first people in Latvia to compile the lists of victims of the Holocaust, the Riga Ghetto's List, and the list of victims of the Riga War.

== Biography ==
Tamāra Zitcere grew up in Latvia and begun her professional career at Riga Stradiņš University. Her career progressed as she started working as a biology teacher at the Nordic Gymnasium in Zolitude, Riga.

Throughout her career, Zitcere garnered recognition for her contributions to professional work and civil society. Notably, in 2003, she was awarded with the Friendly Invitation Medal for her long-term achievements in educating students. On October 5, 2007, she was awarded the "Golden Pen" by the Riga City Council, recognizing her as the best teacher in Riga. In 2008, Zitcere's achievements were further acknowledged when she was nominated for "Woman of the Year 2008" in the Education category. She received the Year Award from the Latvian Ministry of Education and Science, the highest education and science accolade in Latvia, in 2008. This award aims to commend outstanding educators and scientists, enhancing their prestige within society. Zitcere was further recognized in 2009 when she received the prestigious Latvian Society Integration Fund award for promoting tolerance in learning historical facts and developing critical thinking among schoolchildren. That same year, 2009, she was honored with the Ata Kronvalda Foundation award, which was presented by the President of Latvia, Valdis Zatlers.

In 2014, Tamāra Zitcere died due to worsening health complications. She was laid to rest in Riga, Forest Cemetery.

== Riga Ghetto's List ==
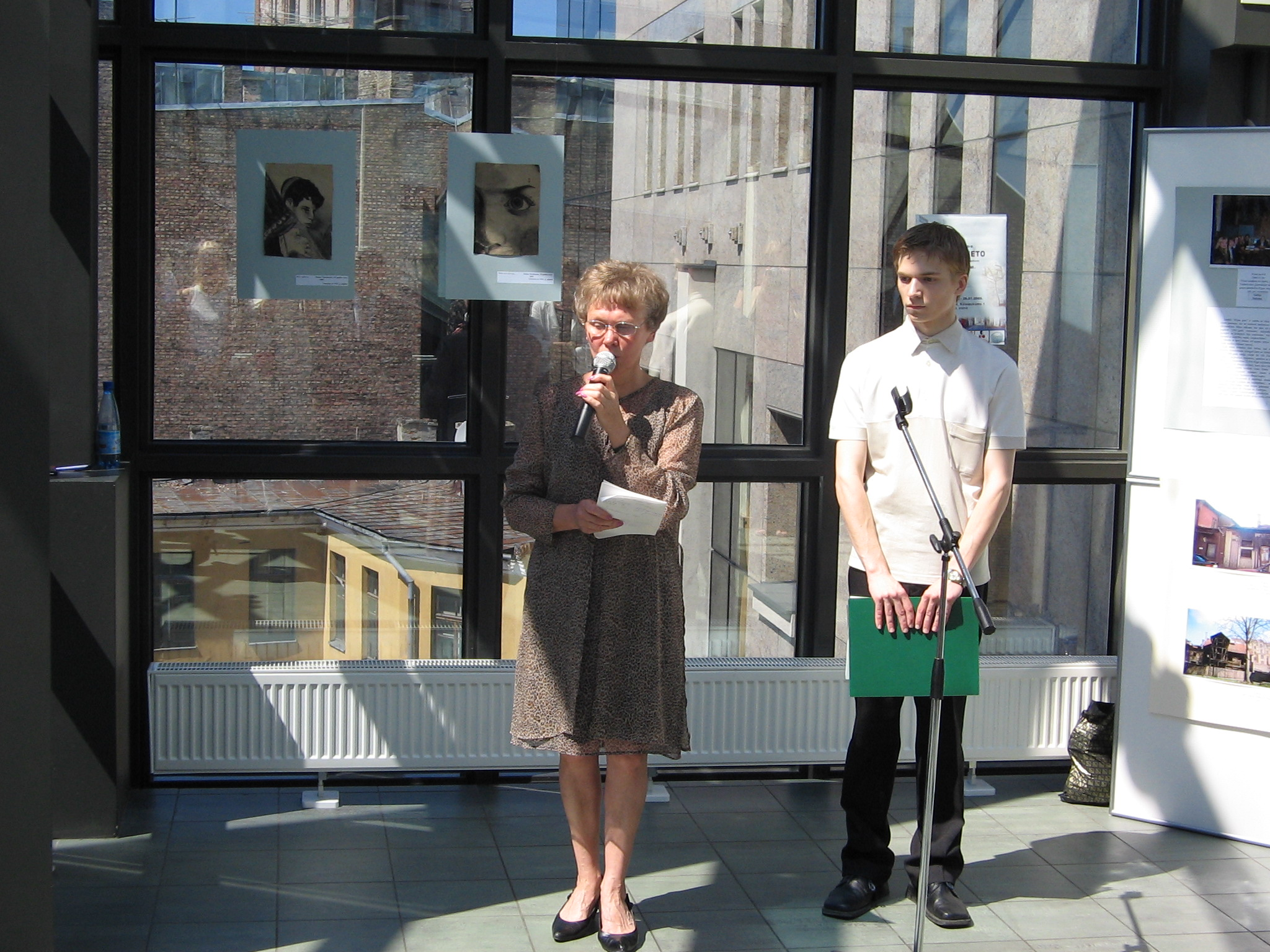
Press conference about Riga Ghetto held in Riga Town Hall in 2005

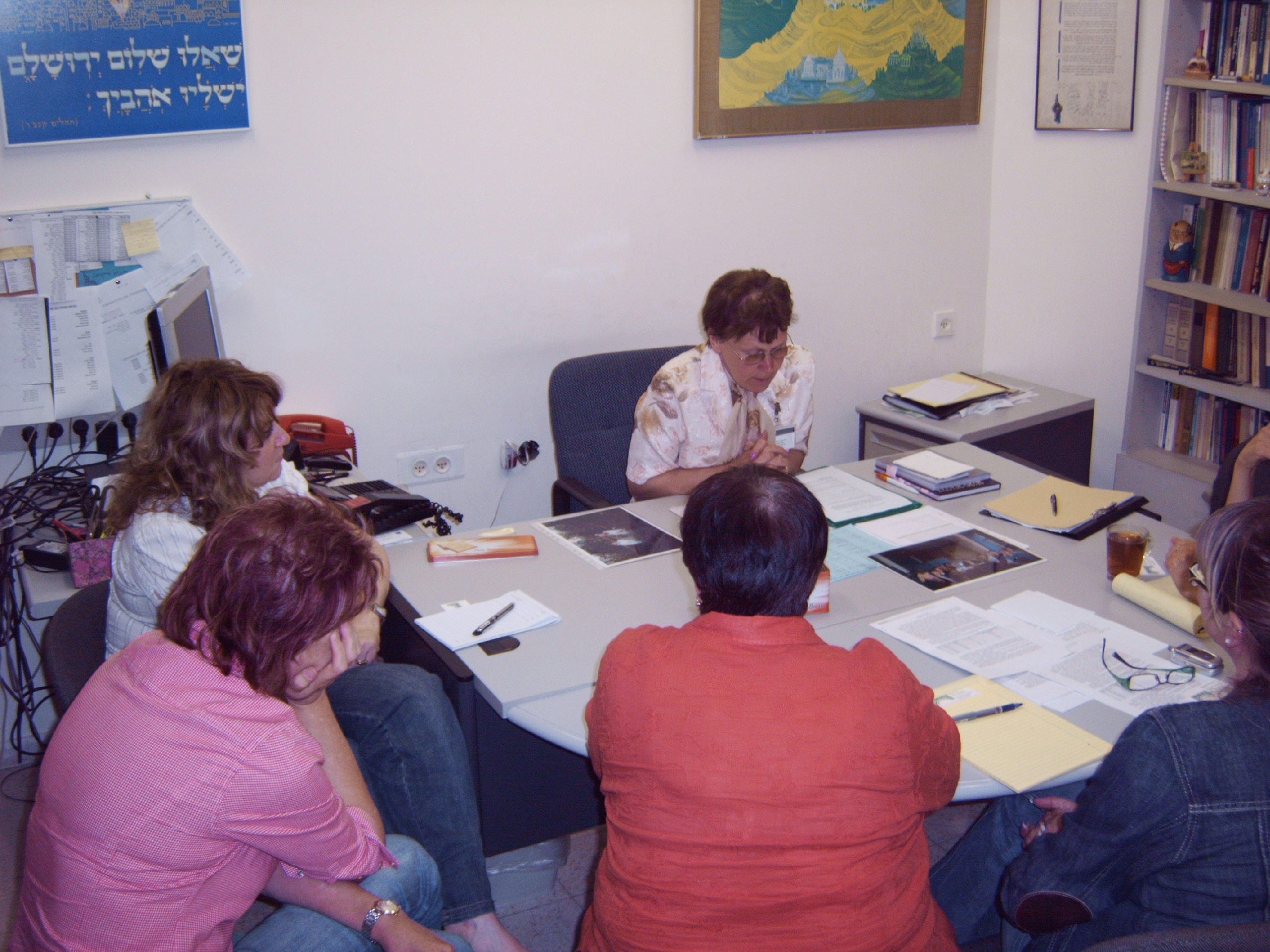
Zitcere presents the Riga Ghetto's List to Israeli government advisers in Tel Aviv, Israel, on May 15, 2007

Tamāra Zitcere one of the notable research accomplishments is Riga Ghetto's List, which contains references of the Jewish people registered at the Jewish ghetto between 1941 and 1943. It includes details like address, previous and subsequent residence, age, place of birth, and occupation. Zitcere's research was a remarkable Holocaust study in its scope and content.

Riga Ghetto's List includes records of victims from the Riga Holocaust, documenting over 65,000 death certificates alongside causes of death. The research shows that the houses in the former Riga Ghetto were enclosed from the rest of the city with barbed wire, serving as a shelter for 29,602 Jews who were forced to leave their original residences during 1941–1943. She reviewed 346 books of house registers at the Latvian State Historical Archive, including over 68 from the Riga ghetto. The Riga Ghetto consisted of a total of 81 houses. Zitcere's research found more than 5,764 Jewish victims of the ghetto. Zitcere supplemented this compilation of records with records from other Riga house books, identifying addresses within the ghetto to which Jewish families were registered. This effort led to the examination of 1941 records from house books on Matīsa, Merķeļa, and Stabu streets in Riga.

By aggregating these lists of Holocaust victims, Zitcere unveiled crucial historical data, which has since been acknowledged by the Commission of Historians of the President of Latvia, the Latvian Academy of Sciences, and various other institutions. This research, started in 2000, and culminated in the creation of the Riga Ghetto's List, revealed poignant stories such as that of Naums Lebedinskis, his wife Liu, and their son Eduards, who tragically ended their lives in 1942 outside the Riga Ghetto at 21 Kuldīgas Street.

The Riga Ghetto's List was exhibited at the Riga Ghetto and Latvian Holocaust Museum in Riga, Latvia and Yad Vashem, Jerusalem, Israel.

== First list of victims of the Riga War of 1941 ==
Tamāra Zitcere is the first to create the initial list of war victims in Riga in Latvian historiography. The list contains the names and information of the first fallen soldiers of the USSR army in June 1941 in Riga and the surrounding region. Before the list was published, it was established that neither the Latvian Occupation Museum nor the Latvian War Museum were in possession of such a list. Tamāra Zitcere compiled the list while researching death certificates, uncovering information on 275 previously unknown war victims who perished in Riga and the region in June 1941. The list shows that the absolute majority of victims were men aged between 20 and 40, with the youngest being a three months old girl, and the oldest 89 years old. The largest number of victims, 115 people, was on June 30. Firearms were the most common cause of death, accounting for nearly half of all cases, with 124 of the deceased identified as soldiers of the Soviet Army. 1941 First List of Riga War Victims was submitted to the Latvian Occupation Museum and the War Museum, while the lists of killed Red Army soldiers were sent to the Russian Embassy. In 2008, the creation of the list was supported by the Riga City Council, and the Special Assignments Minister for Social Integration of Latvia.

Tamāras Zitsere's First list of victims of Riga War of 1941 also revealed that 61 people were murdered by Chekists in Đadaži parish, though the exact dates of the crimes couldn't be determined. Additionally, the head priest, Nikolajs Šalfejevs, reported that in June 1941, 86 Soviet soldiers died as a result of hostilities, according to records from the Riga registry office.
