= History of the Jews in Riga =

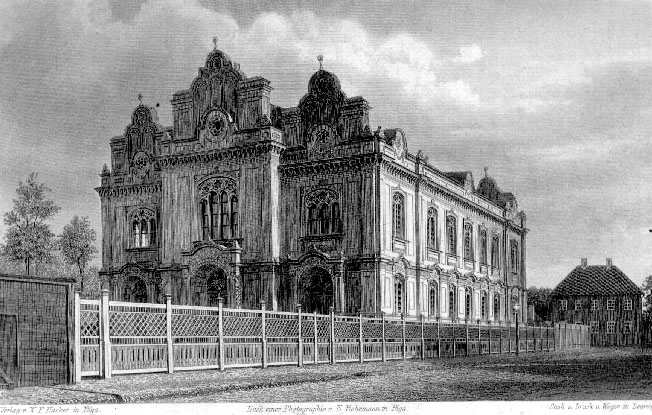
The Great Synagogue in Riga

The Jewish community of Riga, began to exist in the 17th century Riga, in the territory that is now Latvia. However, it was interrupted several times due to the expulsion of Jews from the city. The number of Jews in the city grew significantly during the 19th century, reaching a peak before the Holocaust.

== Establishment ==
Jewish settlement within the city limits was forbidden since its establishment. In 1301, a decree was issued stating that anyone who provided shelter to a Jew in their home would be heavily punished. From the 16th century, Jewish merchants were allowed to stay outside the city limits, and in 1638, a hostel was opened for them outside the city limits. Between 1581 and 1621, during the period of Polish rule in Riga (under the Polish–Lithuanian Commonwealth), Jews were permitted to live within the city walls, and their numbers in the city and the surrounding province increased. Those Jews were intermediaries between the city's merchants and merchants from other districts in the area. In the years 1621-1710, the Swedes ruled Riga (under Swedish Livonia) and treated the Jews harshly. Upon the conquest of Riga, King Gustav Adolf said: "Jews and foreigners who cause harm to local merchants should not be tolerated in the city." Rabbi Joseph Solomon Bomdiglio passed through Riga on his journey to Lithuania and claimed that most of the Jews of Lithuania were spiritual people, while in Riga and the neighboring towns, most of the Jews were merchants and manual laborers.

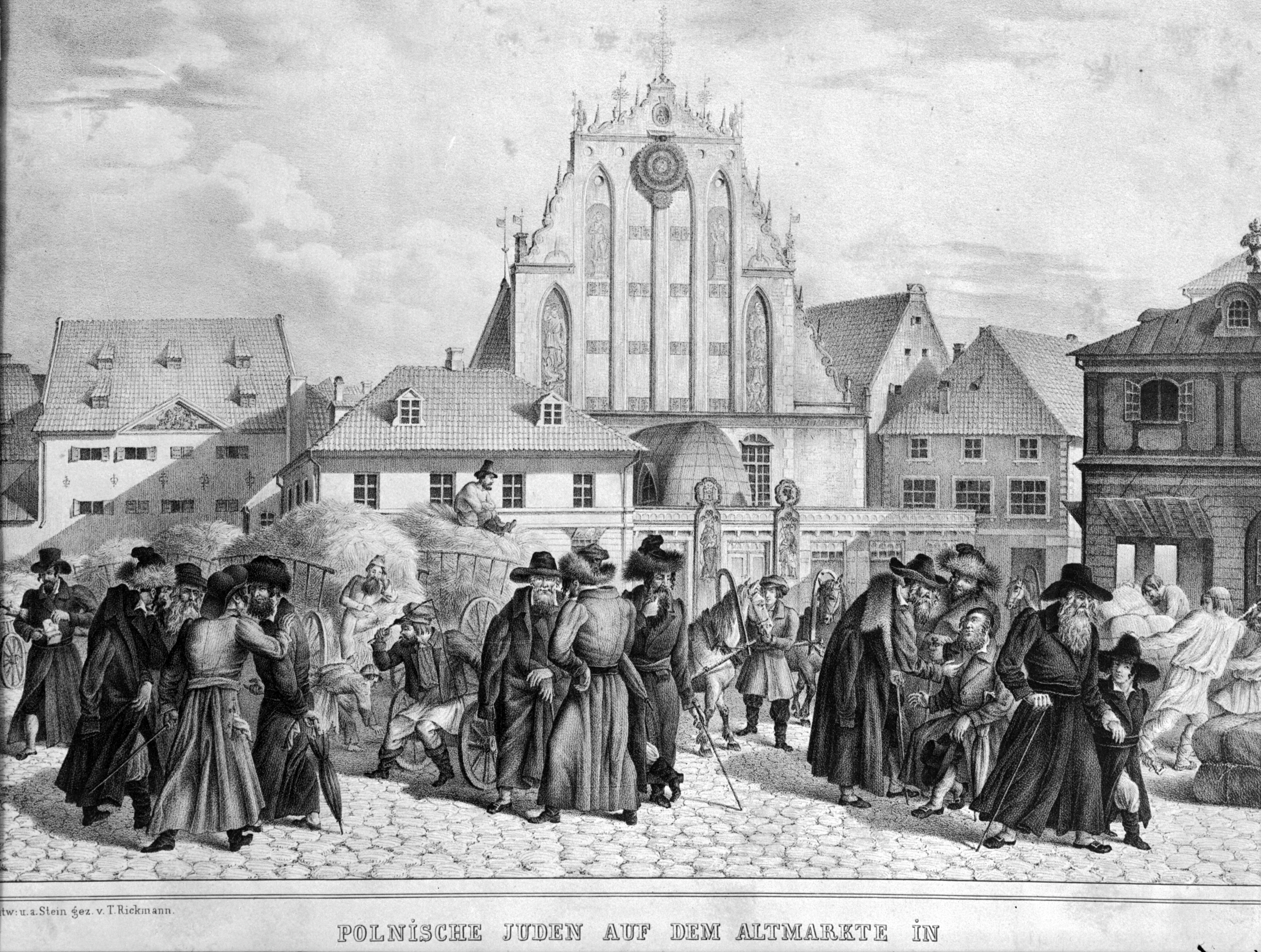
Polish Jews at the Old Market in Riga, 1842. House of Blackheads in the background

== Rule of Tsarist Russia ==
Before the rule of Tsarist Russia in Riga, there were nineteen Jews in the city. In 1710, Riga was conquered by Tsarist Russia. Later in the 18th century, a few Jewish trade agents on behalf of the Tsarist Russian government were allowed to live within the city walls, and in 1725 they were even allowed to sanctify a cemetery. At that time, between 60 and 70 Jews settled in Riga. In 1743, the city's Jewish residents were expelled as part of the expulsion of Jews from Russia, by decree of Empress Elizabeth. Some of the local merchants, who relied economically on the Jewish trade agents, tried to prevent the expulsion but failed. The expulsion significantly damaged the city's economy. Most of the expelled Jews continued to engage in trade and settled near ports: some near the port of Ventspils (Windau) and others near the port of Königsberg. With the rise to power of Catherine II, the entry of Jewish merchants into the city was approved. This empress allowed any skilled merchant who wished to enter the city to do so without discrimination based on differences in religion or origin. In certain documents from 1764, "protected Jews" are mentioned, wealthy merchants who were among the first to return to the city and received special rights.

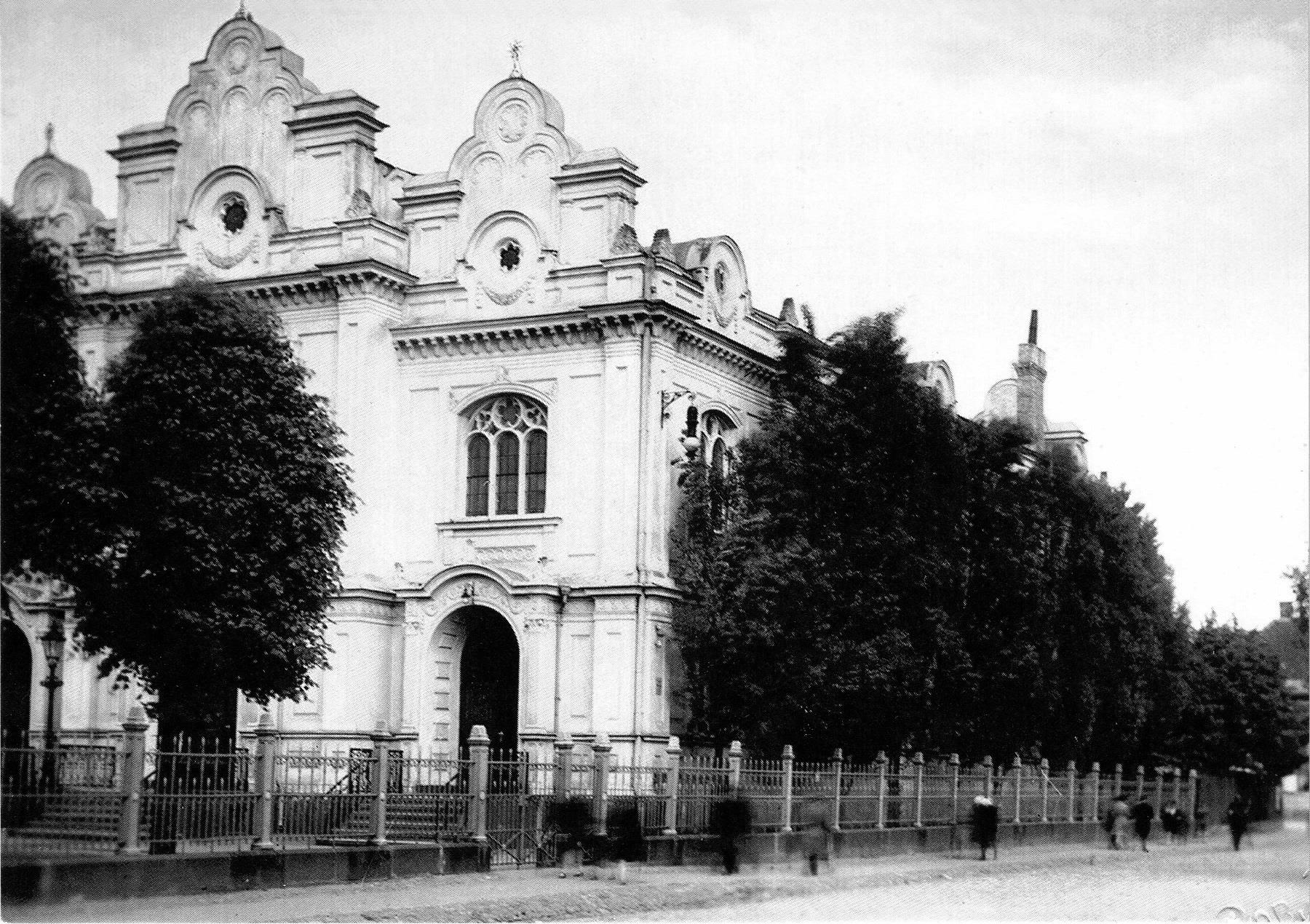
Great Choral Synagogue in Riga

== The flourishing of the community ==
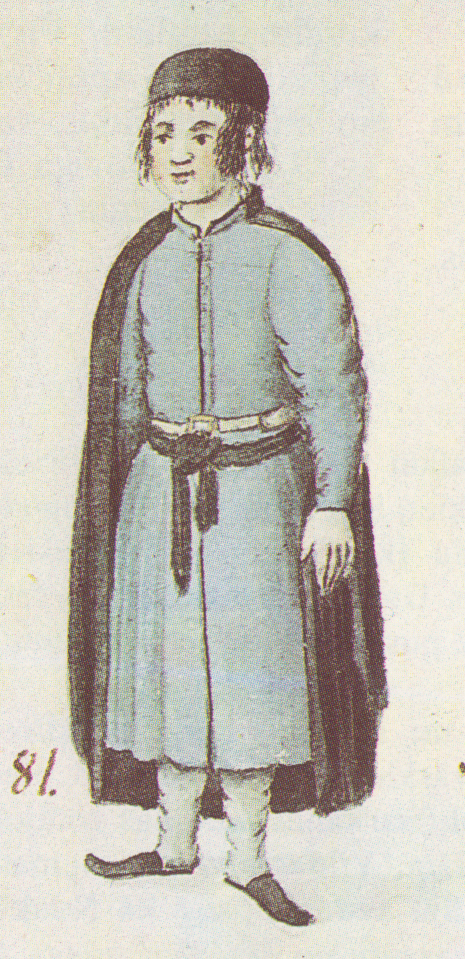
This picture by Johann Christoph Brotze depicts a Jew from Poland who lived in Latvia in the 18th century.

In 1736, there were 736 Jews in the city. The first rabbi of the community was appointed in those years and was Rabbi Shlomo-Pesach Raber. According to the instructions of the local government in Riga, an unofficial leader was chosen for the Jews who was nicknamed the "Elder of the Congregation" and was responsible for arranging religious services in the city and for prayer in temporary prayer houses. He was granted a status of honor among the city's residents and a monthly ascent to the Land of Israel free of charge as an appreciation for his work. The Elder of the Congregation led the community committee, which assisted him in arranging religious and community services. The community committee had five members. The Elder of the Congregation was also responsible for the charity institutions that were established in the city. In 1893, this responsibility was transferred to the municipality. In 1785, Jewish settlement was allowed in the Baltic Sea coast region, and additional Jews arrived in Riga. They traded and settled there but were considered residents of the town of Shlok, located 38 kilometers from Riga. During these years, the community flourished, with hundreds of Jews concentrating in it, establishing synagogues and schools, and having community life. A conflict also developed between those "protected Jews" mentioned in 1764 and the descendants of Jews who had previously lived in Riga but were expelled from it and were nicknamed "foreign Jews". In 1810, about 700 Jews lived in the city in three classes: protected Jews, foreign Jews, and Shlok Jews.

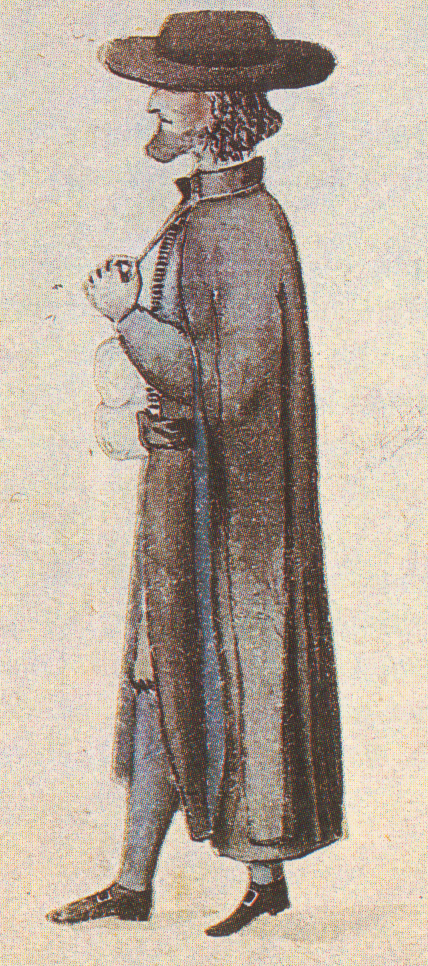
A Polish Jewish trader, drawn by Johann Christoph Brotze during his time in the territory of modern-day Latvia.

Starting from 1822, protected Jews were allowed to make a living from managing shelters and soup kitchens but were not allowed to engage in goldsmithing. In 1842, the Jewish community in the city was officially established, with 409 Jews registered in the city as official residents. At the same time, a Jewish school was established in Riga under the management of Dr. Menachem Max Lilienthal, who was appointed to this position by the government. In 1843, the first synagogue in the city was established. The rabbi of the synagogue was Rabbi Aharon bar Elchanan, a student of the Volozhin Yeshiva in Belarus. After his death, he was replaced by Rabbi Yaakov Rivlin. Many Jews immigrated to the city under the rule of Alexander II for economic reasons. Alexander II was interested in developing the Baltic region commercially and industrially, allowed the immigration of many residents to it, and thus harmed the livelihood of the Jews (the immigrants created a lot of competition for the Jewish merchants and harmed their livelihood). Jews began to immigrate to Riga with certificates proving that they were merchants, craftsmen, and industrialists, and thus received permission to reside in the city.

The number of residents in the city continued to grow, and in 1864 there were already 2,641 Jews in the city. One of the early Hasidim who settled in Riga was Rabbi Yeshayahu Berlin, who settled in Riga in 1877-1878. In 1897, the number of Jews in the city grew to 22,000. That same year, Lev Shlit participated in the First Zionist Congress held in Basel, Switzerland as a representative of the "Zion" association that developed in Riga. The following year, A. Ettingen represented Riga at the Second Zionist Congress and the First Russian Zionist Conference. In 1913, there were already 33,651 Jews in it. Most of the Jews were merchants and industrialists. Most of the merchants were engaged in the export of wood, grain, and flax. The industrialists among them opened and managed factories, flour mills, and printing houses. In addition, many Jews chose to engage in the medical profession.

Over the years, many synagogues were opened in the city: in 1850, the Altneuschul synagogue was established, in 1871 the Great Synagogue "Cor Schul" (the Choral Synagogue of Riga) was opened, and in 1873 a school for soldiers was inaugurated. By 1915, about 40 synagogues and minyanim were established in the city.

== World War I ==
On the eve of World War I, there were 33,651 Jews in Riga, 7% of the total population. During the war, over forty thousand Jewish war refugees arrived in Riga, mainly from Courland. From Courland alone, forty thousand Jews were deported by cruel means on the pretext that they were spies for the German army. The refugees were transferred to central Russia by freight trains and many of them passed through Riga on the way. Rabbi Alexander Zuskind Berlin, Rabbi Eliyahu Shlitt, Professor P. Mintz, Rabbi Eliezer Ettinger and other leaders of the local community at that time established an aid committee for refugees and war victims. A third of Riga's residents voluntarily left the city in 1916, and among those residents were also many Jews. At the beginning of September 1917, the German army managed to break through the Russian front in Latvia and advance towards Riga, and before September 10, 1917, Riga fell into German hands.

== Inter-war period ==
In 1918, there were 28,000 Jews in Riga. With the surrender of the German Empire, the Russians tried to reconquer Latvia but were stopped by the Latvians. For many months, Latvia and Russia negotiated a peace agreement, and on August 11, 1920, a peace agreement was signed in which Russia recognized Latvia's independence. In January 1921, the United Kingdom, France, Japan, Poland, and other countries recognized Latvia's independence. At the end of 1919, the Riga City Council established new Jewish educational institutions where the language of instruction was Yiddish. Jewish schools where the language of instruction was Russian or German switched to teaching in Yiddish and Hebrew.

In 1920, 24,725 Jews lived in Riga. Latvia's economy was severely damaged in World War I, and Latvian Jews played an important role in its recovery, mainly through the import of goods and currencies. In 1927, the Betar movement was founded in the city. Other sports movements also operated in the city, such as the Peretz Sports Association, HaKoach, Maccabi, and Hapoel. By 1934, schools, kindergartens, and a teacher training institute operated in Riga under the auspices of the "Tsentraler Yiddisher Shul Organizatsye" (TsYShO - Central Organization for Yiddish Schools). In addition, a gymnasium where the language of instruction was Hebrew and a music school operated in the city under the auspices of the Society for the Advancement of Science and Arts in Latvia. The city also had a Jewish theater, a drama club, two choirs, several libraries, and several publishing houses. In 1934, religious educational institutions came under the auspices of Agudath Israel. In 1935, there were 43,000 Jews in the city. On the eve of World War II, almost half of Latvia's Jews, 46.7% of Latvia's Jews, lived in Riga.

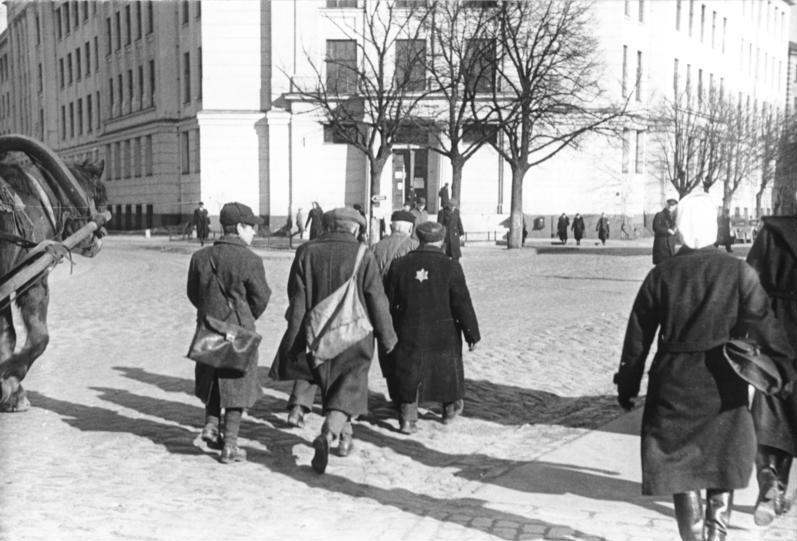
Jews in Riga wearing the yellow patch, around 1942

== World War II ==
With the outbreak of World War II and under the influence of the Molotov-Ribbentrop Pact, the Soviet Union invaded Latvia as a whole, and Riga in particular. From the summer of 1940, Soviet rule was established in the area. Many young Jews migrated to Riga from other nearby cities and settled there. In a short time, the number of Jews in the city rose to 50,000. The Soviet regime gradually dismantled the community institutions and Zionist movements.

On June 14, 1941, six thousand Jews from Riga were exiled to Siberia. Five days after the Molotov-Ribbentrop Pact was violated, the Soviet Union retreated from Latvia. Five thousand Jews joined the retreating Soviet forces and were concentrated in camps and villages. Some of the Jews joined the Red Army. On July 1 of that year, Riga was occupied by the Nazi German army. On July 21, 1941, it was decided to concentrate the Jews in a ghetto.

On July 23, the Jews were ordered to wear a yellow star and register at the police station. They were also forced to hand over their property to the Germans and were required to perform forced labor. The Riga Ghetto was established in the "Moscow District," on the outskirts of the city. According to an order issued by the Nazi authorities, all Jews had to be relocated to the ghetto no later than October 25. In the ghetto, a "Council of Elders" operated, headed by Michael Elyashiv.

On November 26, the northeastern part of the ghetto was evacuated of its residents and fenced off. This part was called the "Small Ghetto" and later served as a labor camp for able-bodied men who survived the Rumbula Forest massacre. By the end of the year, most of Riga's Jews, about 27,000 people, had been murdered. The survivors, approximately 4,800 people, were moved to the small ghetto. The large ghetto (the remaining part of the ghetto) was filled with Jews transferred to the Riga Ghetto from other ghettos, mainly from the Kovno Ghetto. In June 1942, 15 people who smuggled medicines and food into the ghetto were murdered. On October 28 of that year, a group of Jews attempting to escape from the ghetto was murdered. One member of the group managed to return to the ghetto and survived. In retaliation, the Germans executed 108 Jews and 42 Jewish policemen were shot. On November 2, 1943, the second major Aktion took place in the ghetto, and 2,000 people were murdered. The remaining Jews were sent to extermination camps in Poland, to Treblinka and Auschwitz. On October 13, 1944, the city was liberated by the Red Army.

== Commemoration ==
In 1989, the "Jews in Latvia Museum" was established in Riga, focusing on the research and preservation of all testimonies related to Latvian Jewry and specifically the Jews of Riga. In September 2010, the "Riga Ghetto and Latvian Holocaust Museum" was opened in the ghetto area. The museum features a reconstructed Jewish apartment and a reconstructed barrack from that period. The site also includes a reconstructed street with a gate and barbed wire fence. Along the street, there are signs with the names of more than 75,000 Latvian Jews who perished in the Holocaust. In the Rumbula Forest, a memorial site was established for the Jews massacred there, centered around a memorial shaped like a menorah, surrounded by stones arranged in the shape of a Star of David with the names of the victims engraved on them.

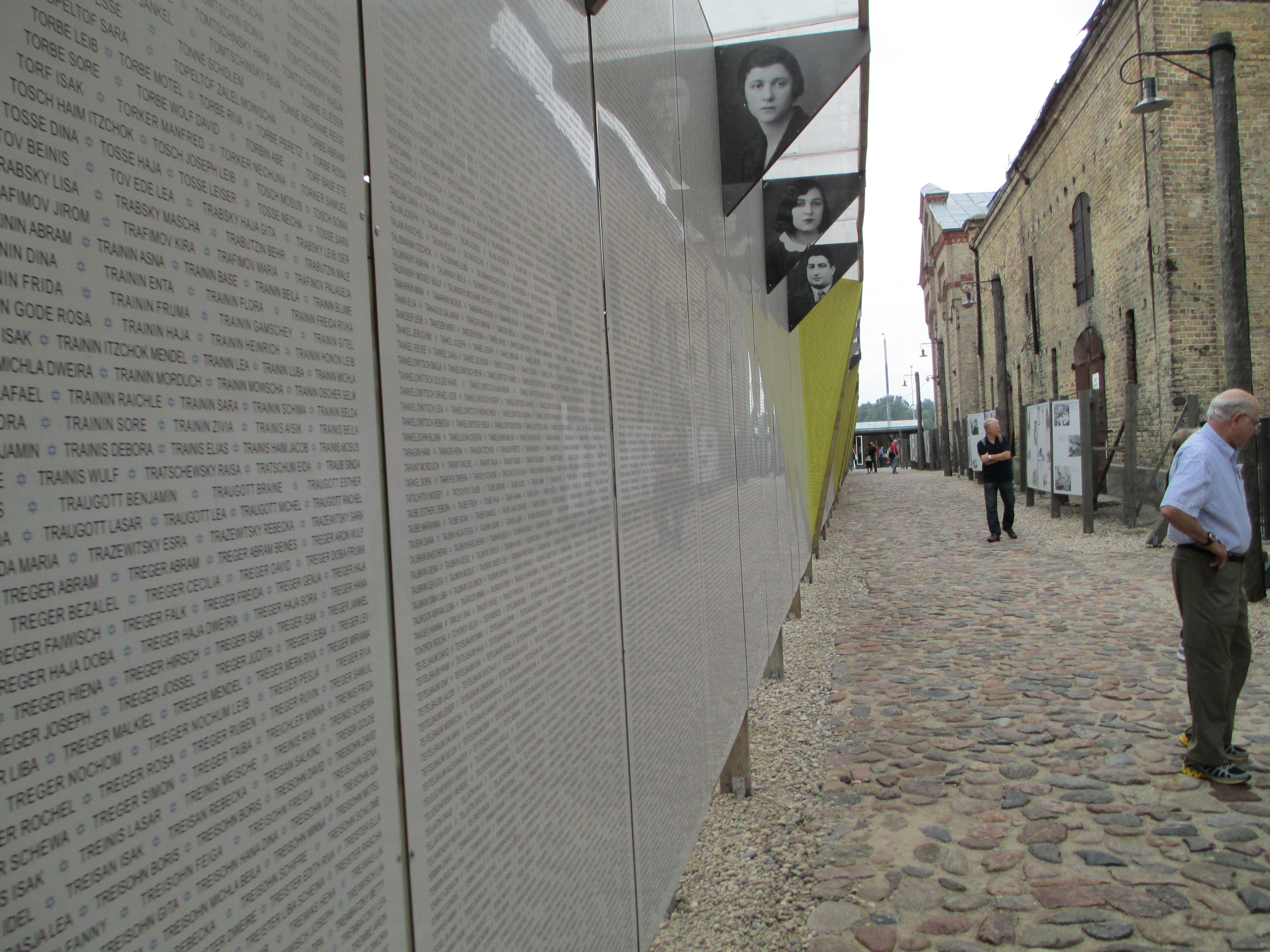
A wall of the names of the murdered in the Riga Ghetto Museum and the Latvian Jewish Holocaust

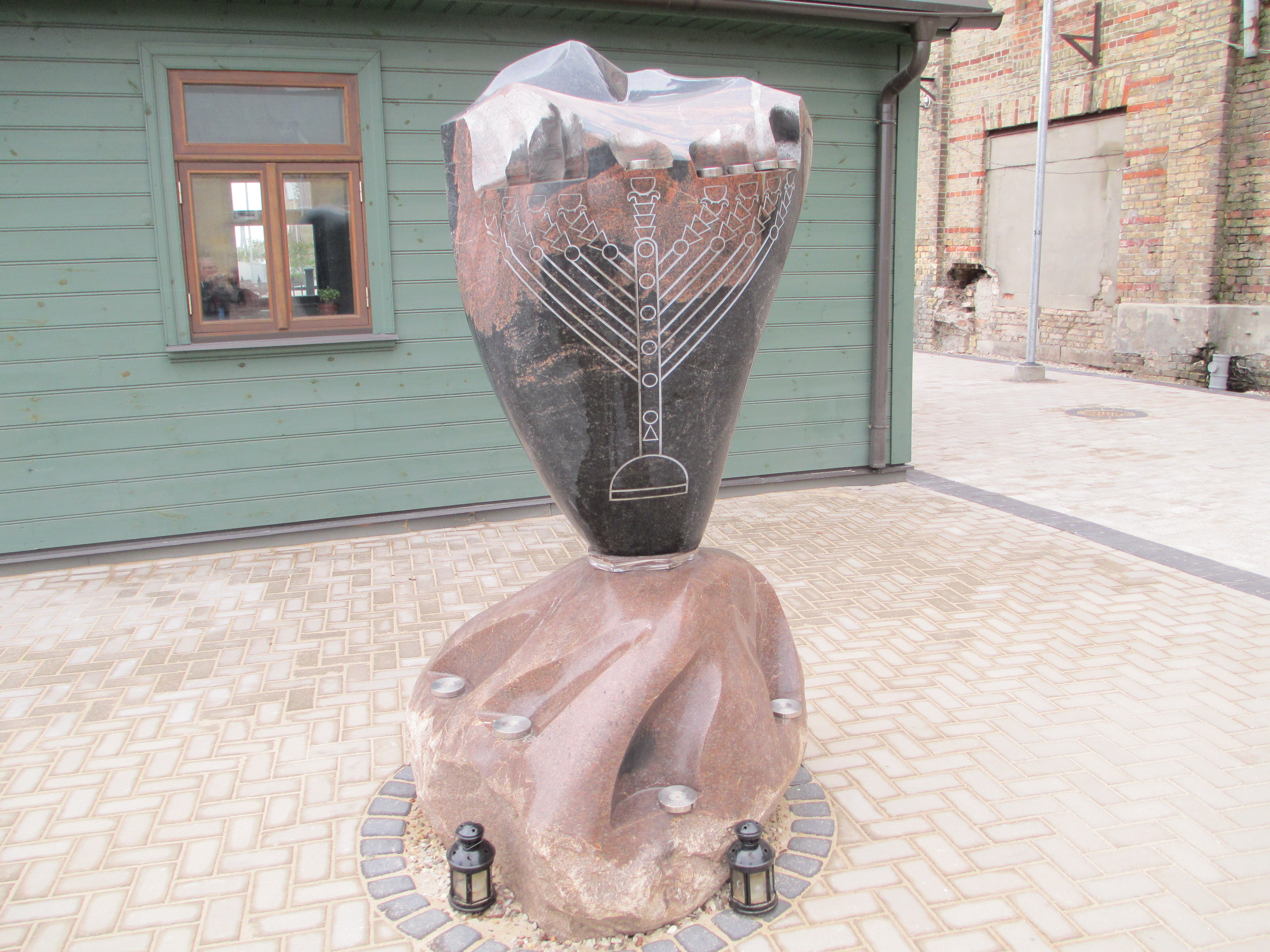
Memorial in the Riga Ghetto Museum

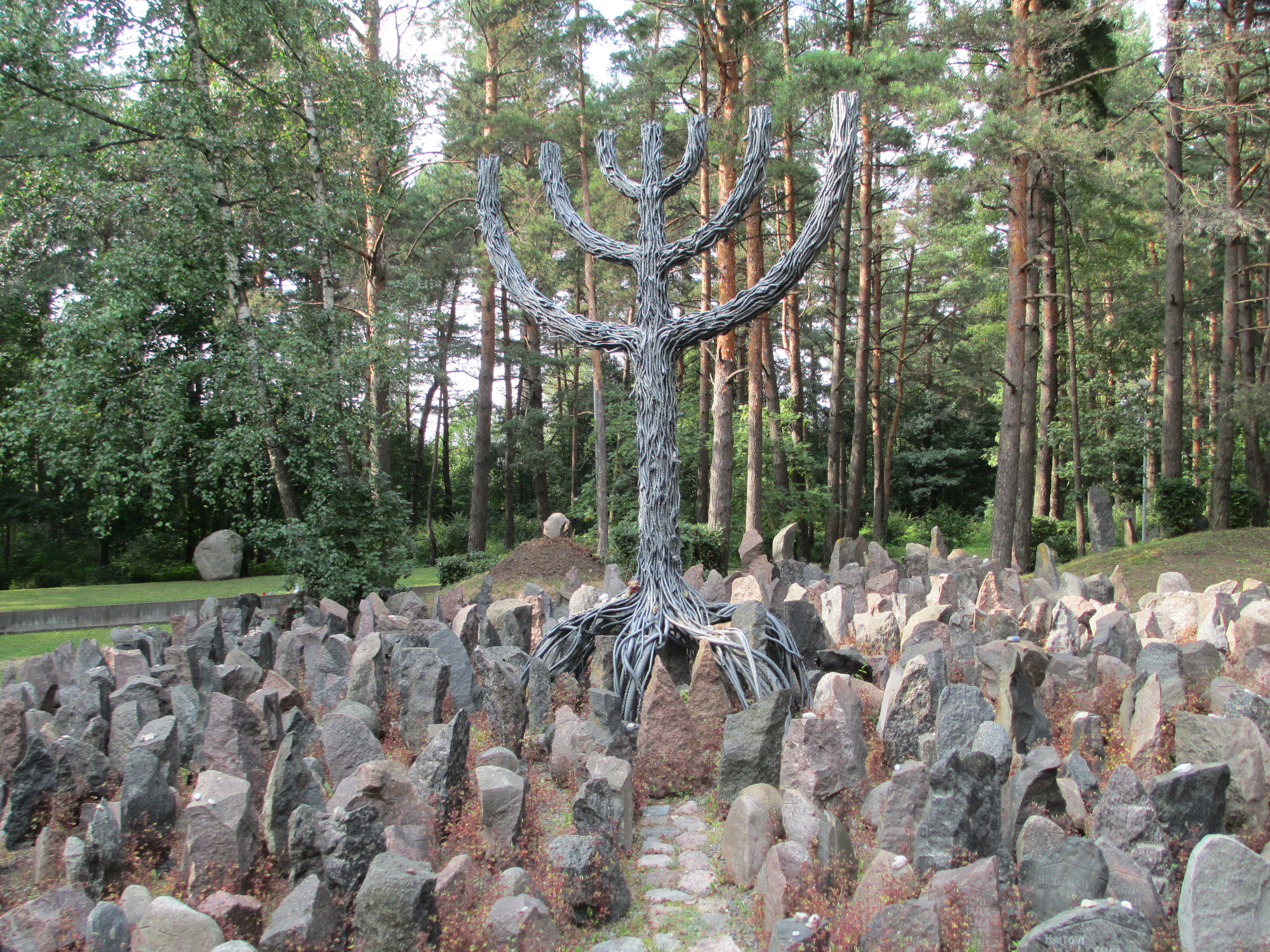
A monument in Rumbula forest to the memory of the Jews of the Riga ghetto who were murdered on the site

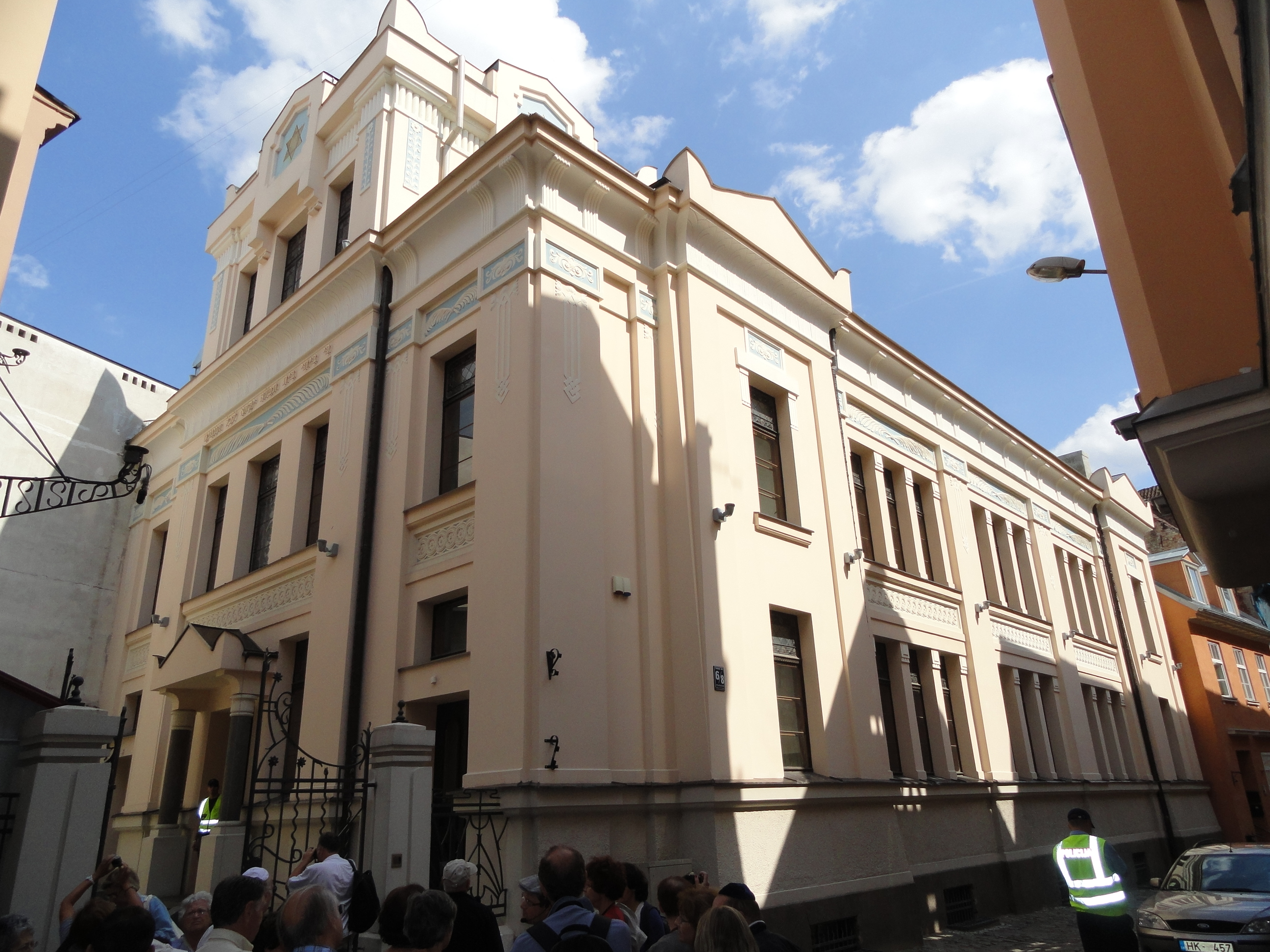
Peitav Synagogue, the only synagogue in Riga to have survived the Holocaust and to be currently active
