= Anna Rūmane-Ķeniņa =

Latvian teacher and writer

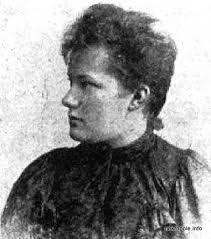
- Born: 13 November 1877; Jelgava, Latvia
- Died: 9 November 1950 (aged 72); Rīga, Latvia
- Citizenship: Latvia
- Occupations: Teacher; women's organization leader; journalist
- Spouse: Ata Ķeniņš (m. 1898; div. 1923)
- Awards: Ordre des Palmes académiques, France; Order of the Three Stars, Latvia

Anna Rūmane-Ķeniņa (1877–1950) was a Latvian teacher, writer, women's organization organizer and public figure who campaigned for Latvian independence.

== Early life and education ==
Anna Rūmane-Ķeniņa was born into an affluent family on 13 November 1877 in Jelgava in central Latvia. She studied at the girls' high school in Jelgava until 1896. This was a school where only a few Latvian girls studied, being mainly reserved for the daughters of German nobles and senior Russian officials, with courses being taught in German and Russian. In 1897 she became a teacher in the town of Biķernieki.

== Teaching ==
She married Ata Ķeniņš in 1898. Their first daughter was born a year later. From 1898 to 1900 she was head of the Zemīte Parish School, a private school. In 1900, Rūmane-Ķeniņa founded a four-year private girls' school in Āgenskalns in Riga, capital of Latvia. In 1907 she converted this school into a high school (gymnasium) and until 1912 she was the director of the school. Among those the school attracted as teachers were writers and artists such as Kārlis Skalbe and Emīls Dārziņš. Her home was also a prominent meeting place for Latvian intellectuals.

== Travel and further education ==
Rūmane-Ķeniņa was a keen traveller and had the resources to enable her to make many trips outside of Latvia. Between 1901 and 1907 she travelled to Austria, Switzerland, France and Italy, where she stayed in Ospedaletti in Liguria in the winter for reasons of health. After the First Russian Revolution in 1905, the family fled to Helsinki in Finland, returning in 1906. She attended lectures at the Sorbonne University in Paris from 1911 and studied at the University of Geneva from 1913 to 1916, graduating from the Jean-Jacques Rousseau Pedagogical Institute in Geneva. By this time, she was writing articles in the foreign press advocating independence for Latvia. In 1914 she sent an anonymous contribution to the Journal de Genève in reaction to a pacifist manifesto published by the writer and 1915 Nobel Prize for Literature winner Romain Rolland, in which she stressed the dilemma faced by Latvians when faced with being trapped between the threat of Pan-Germanism and Pan-Slavism.

By 1917, World War I was significantly affecting her income and she needed to find a job. Between 1917 and 1919 she was responsible for Baltic Affairs in the Press Department of the French Ministry of Foreign Affairs. In 1918 she participated in the founding of the French magazine Revue Baltique. She wrote newspaper and magazine articles in favour of independence for Latvia, a movement that gained impetus following the 1917 Russian Revolution. In 2018 she coordinated a large meeting in Geneva that drew attention to the public and journalists from Switzerland and elsewhere to the situation facing Latvia, particularly after the Treaty of Brest-Litovsk was signed in March 1918, between the new Bolshevik government of Russia and the Central Powers (German Empire, Austria-Hungary, Bulgaria, and the Ottoman Empire), which endorsed Germany's control of Latvia. In the autumn of 1919, Rūmane-Ķeniņa became the head of the press office of the Latvian Ministry of Foreign Affairs in Paris. In 1920, she founded the Franco-Latvian Convergence Committee.

== Return to Latvia ==
In 1920, Rūmane-Ķeniņa returned to independent Latvia and worked in various women's organizations, being one of the main founders in 1922 of the Latvian Women's National League, after Latvia became independent in 1921. She was an unsuccessful candidate in the 1920 Latvian Constitutional Assembly election, as a member of the Democrats Union. She also founded the Latvian Alliance française in 1921. In the same year, the French government made her a member of the Ordre des Palmes académiques "For Merit in French Culture". She continued to write press articles, including for Jaunākās Ziņas (The Latest News), Latvia's leading paper at the time. In 1926 she was made an Officer of the Latvian Order of the Three Stars.

After her return to Latvia, she continued to travel, visiting the cities of Poland, Italy, the French Riviera and Washington, D.C., where she attended the International Women's Union congress, from there visiting several other US cities to give lectures on Latvia. This visit to the US gave inspiration for several articles for Jaunākās Ziņas. She told a Latvian magazine that she was planning to visit India, although there is no evidence that this trip took place. She returned to the US in 1929, when she met Eleanor Roosevelt, future first lady of the United States.

In 1944, as a World War II refugee, she went to Germany, where she worked for the German magazine Signal, a glossy magazine for distribution outside of Germany that was largely funded by the Wehrmacht Propaganda Troops. At the end of the war, she found herself in the Soviet occupation zone of Berlin, from where she made her way back to Latvia.

== Literary activity ==
Rūmane-Ķeniņa started writing in the press in 1896, with articles on political, pedagogical and women's issues and French literature, and about her travels. Under the pseudonyms of Rāmaviete, Aina Rasmer, and Aina Rasmere she published stories, portraits and plays in newspapers in Saint Petersburg and in Latvian newspapers such as the Baltic Journal, Druva and Tēvija. Her visits to Italy led to a series of seven articles entitled From the South. Her autobiographical story, Mother's Sorrow, (1912) is said to be one of the most emotional depictions of a mother's experience of losing a child in Latvian literature.

== Personal life ==
Rūmane-Ķeniņa and her husband had six children, three boys and three girls. One daughter died in her second year and another in 1918 as a result of contracting Spanish flu. From 1913 the couple were mainly living apart; she in Switzerland and he in Russia. They divorced in 1923.

== Death ==
Rūmane-Ķeniņa died on 9 November 1950 in Rīga. She was buried in the Great Cemetery of Riga.
