= Pinkas haKehilot =

- Book cover, series, sample.
- Original title: פנקס הקהילות
- Language: Hebrew and Yiddish
- Subject: History of the Holocaust
- Publisher: Yad Vashem
- Publication place: Israel

Pinkas haKehillot or Pinkas Ha-kehilot, (Hebrew: פנקס הקהילות; notebook of the [Jewish] communities; plural: Pinkasei haKehillot) Encyclopedia of Jewish Communities from Their Foundation till after the Holocaust, is a book series presenting collected historical information and demographic data on Eastern European countries' Jewish communities, most of which were depopulated and whose populations were exterminated in the Holocaust. Pinkasei haKehillot was published from 1969 to 2007 and is one of the major projects undertaken by Yad Vashem in Jerusalem, the State of Israel's Holocaust memorial authority, concisely documenting this aspect of the history of the Holocaust.

== Content ==
Each volume of Pinkas Hakehillot is produced geographically, with locale names in Yiddish as well as the local language's version. The content is composed of collected documents, lists, personal memoirs in their original unedited form, historical accounts and essays devoted to the life of Jewish communities from antiquity until the present, including maps and period photographs. The Pinkas attempts to illustrate "the life that once was and is no more".

The series, which was released over a few decades, has eleven parts: on Romania, Germany, Hungary, Poland, the Netherlands, Latvia & Estonia, Yugoslavia, Lithuania, Libya & Tunisia, Greece, and Slovakia.

== Awards ==
In 1973, the project was awarded the Israel Prize, for its special contribution to society and the State. It receives financial support from the Memorial Foundation for Jewish Culture.
