= 1998 Riga bombing =

1998 building bombing in Riga, Latvia

1998 Riga bombings
- Time: March–April 1998
- Location: Riga, Latvia; 56°56′45″N 24°06′38″E
- Suspects: Unknown

The 1998 Riga bombings were a series of bombings that took place in Riga, Latvia and which received considerable coverage at the time, most notably for their connection with fascist groups and the perception of an increase of fascism in Latvia. The United States government offered to help to locate the suspects, calling the acts "cowardly," and then-Latvian Prime Minister Guntars Krasts condemned the bombings, calling them an attempt to destabilize the country.

At 1:50 am on April 2 a bomb exploded in Riga's old town outside the 92-year-old Peitav Synagogue, the only surviving working synagogue in the city, causing severe damage to the building and surrounding area. The bomb, which was supposedly planted by fascist extremists, was reportedly placed on the front steps of the synagogue building. The bomb caused extensive damage, including tearing out the 90 kg oak door, destroying all the windows and casings of the basement and first and second floors, and leaving deep gouges in the wall. There were no casualties.

Four days after the April 2 bombing, another explosion caused damage to the Russian Embassy in Riga. As with the April 2 explosion, there were no injuries. The cause of the blast was plastic explosives detonated in a trash bin. The attack was linked with a rise in nationalist and extremist actions that seriously unsettled relations among Latvians, Jews and Russians. Alexander Udaltsev, Russia's ambassador to Latvia, joined Latvian leaders in blaming the incident on those trying to drive a wedge between Russians and Latvians. The Russian Foreign Ministry controversially blamed the bombing outside its Riga embassy on "anti-Russian hysteria recently produced in Latvia and the encouragement of nationalism and extremism" and called for drastic measures to punish those who were guilty.

A few days after the Riga bombings, a monument to Latvian victims of the Holocaust was defaced in the port town of Liepāja.

== May 1995 bombings ==
The April 2, 1998, attack was the second bomb attack on the synagogue. The synagogue was targeted on May 6, 1995, but far less damage was caused.

== Moscow bombings ==
Similar explosions occurred on May 13, 1998, in Moscow, where a bomb ripped through the outer wall of the city's Maryina Roshcha synagogue, the center of Moscow's active Lubavitch community. The explosion caused significant damage to the ground floor sanctuary, destroyed cars parked nearby, and caused minor injuries to two people in an adjacent building. No one in the synagogue was hurt. The congregation's original wood synagogue was burned to the ground in 1993, in what was thought at the time to be an accidental fire. The new building, dedicated in 1996, suffered an earlier bomb attack a few months after reopening. The attack was linked with the synagogue attack in Riga less than a month earlier. However, the attacks were carried out in a far more professional way.

== Latvian–Russian crisis ==
The bombings strained relations between the Latvian and Russian governments:

March 3: About 1000 mostly Russian demonstrators gather outside the Riga City Council building. Police drive them back with batons.

March 4: Russian leaders complain about violence shown towards protesters, condemning the actions of Latvian police. Latvian Prime minister Guntars Krasts speaks out in defense of the Latvian police force.

March 6: Russian Prime Minister Viktor Chernomyrdin openly criticises Guntars Krasts and states, "The news of what happened there sent shivers down Russia's spine."

March 16: In Riga, over 500 veterans of the Latvian Legion walk in commemoration through the center of the capital, prompting bitter condemnations from Moscow. The Russian Foreign Ministry reacted causing yet more controversy, saying: "This attention to fascist underlings is shameful for Europe."

March 28: Another demonstration is held at the Latvian Embassy in Moscow. Yury Luzhkov, a potential candidate for Russian president states that "Russians in Latvia have been turned into slaves." The EU stands by Russia.

April 1: The Latvian Ministry of Economics says that Russia is already applying low-level sanctions, including slowing down foodstuffs at the border and limiting Latvian fishing rights in Russian waters, which have already cost Latvia some $300,000,000.

April 2: The bombing of Peitav Synagogue in Riga takes place in the early hours of the morning. The explosion again draws unwanted attention to Latvia. No one steps forward to take responsibility for the attack, and Latvia asks the FBI for help in finding the perpetrators. The head of Latvia's police force is fired for not taking better safety precautions.

April 3: The Latvian Security Council, which includes the president and prime minister, calls for the dismissal of the county's military chief for taking part in the Latvian Legion Day march the month before.

April 4: President of Latvia Guntis Ulmanis expresses concern that bad press has damaged the country's prospects of joining the EU.

April 6: A small explosive goes off in a trash bin just across the street from the Russian embassy in central Riga. Moscow says the explosion is even further proof that extremism is rampant in Latvia. The Latvian press says the bombing at the embassy has all the hallmarks of the Russian secret service.

April 8: The largest party in the multi-party coalition, the center-left Saimnieks, announces that it is leaving the government. It criticizes the prime minister for contributing to the deterioration of relations with Russia.

== See also ==
- List of terrorist incidents, 1998
- Terrorism in Latvia
