= Biķernieki =

Village in Latvia

- Location within Daugavpils municipality Location within Latvia
- Coordinates: 55°59′0″N 26°48′0″E
- Country: Latvia
- Municipality: Augšdaugava Municipality

Population (2015)
  - Total: 251
- Time zone: UTC+2 (EET)
  - Summer (DST): UTC+3 (EEST)

Biķernieki is a settlement in Biķernieki Parish, Augšdaugava Municipality in the Latgale region of Latvia. It is located in the western part of the parish, on the banks of the Leiksna River.
