= Peitav Synagogue =

Orthodox synagogue in Riga, Latvia

- Latvian: Peitavas ielas sinagoga
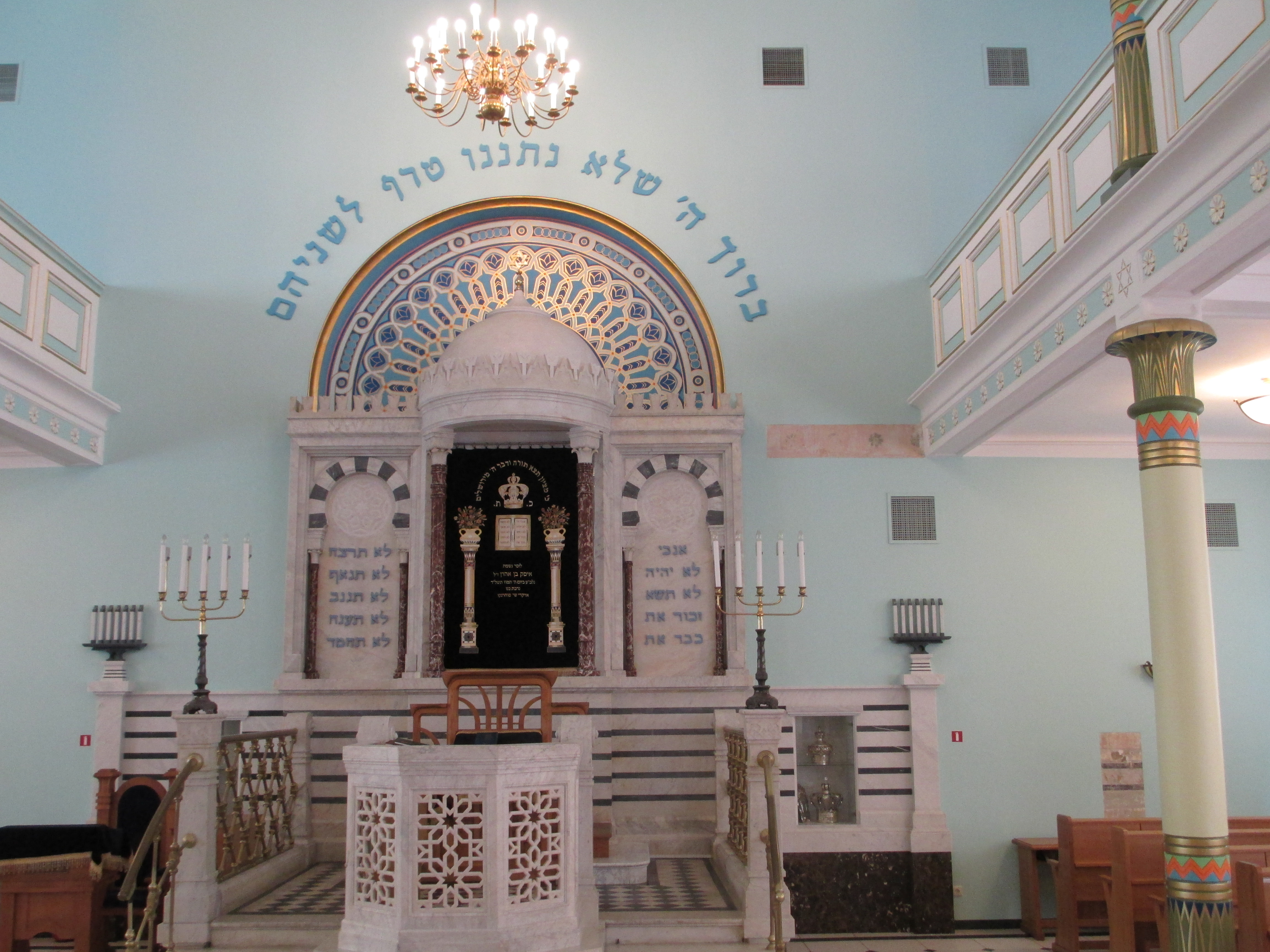
- The restored synagogue interior, in 2013

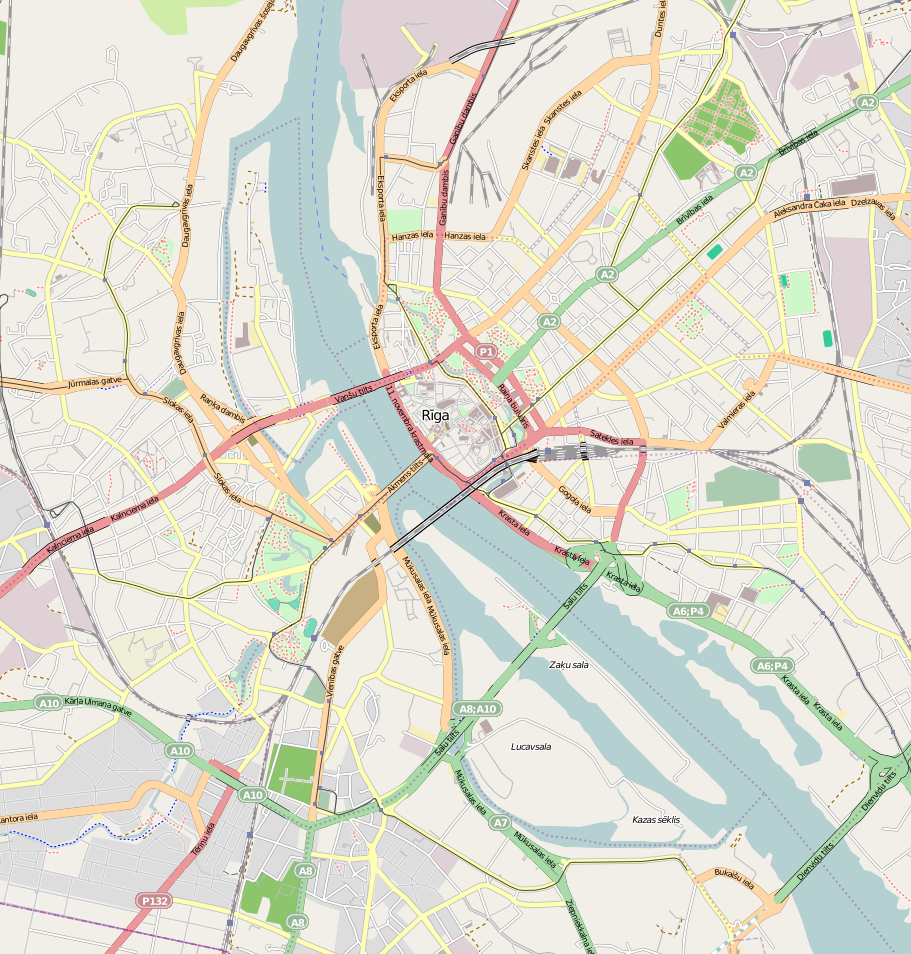
- Location of the synagogue in Riga

Religion
- Affiliation: Orthodox Judaism
- Rite: Nusach Ashkenaz
- Ecclesiastical or organizational status: Synagogue (1905–1941); Profane use (WWII); Synagogue (since 2009)
- Status: Active

Location
- Location: 6/8 Pietavas Street, Vecrīga, Riga
- Country: Latvia
- Interactive map of Peitav Synagogue
- Coordinates: 56°56′45″N 24°06′38″E

Architecture
- Architects: Wilhelm Neumann (1905); Karl Seuberlich (2009)
- Type: Synagogue architecture
- Style: Art Nouveau; Egyptian Revival
- Completed: 1905
- Materials: Brick

The Peitav Synagogue (Latvian: Peitavas ielas sinagoga) or Peitav-Shul (Yiddish: פאייטאוו שול) is an Orthodox Jewish congregation and synagogue, located at 6/8 Pietavas Street, Vecrīga, in Riga, Latvia.

Designed by Wilhelm Neumann in the Art Nouveau and Egyptian Revival styles, the synagogue was completed in 1905. It was devastated by Nazis and was partially destroyed on 4 July 1941. Used for profane purposes During World War II and damaged by bombings in 1995 and 1998, the synagogue was restored and reopened in 2009. It is a center of the Latvian Jewish community and recognized by the Latvian government as an architectural monument of national significance.

== History ==
The synagogue was built 1903-1905, designed by architect Wilhelm Neumann in an Art Nouveau style with Egyptian Revival elements. When Riga's synagogues were burned in 1941 by the Nazis and their Latvian collaborators, the Peitav Synagogue was the only one to survive because of its location in the Old Town, adjacent to other buildings. Subsequently, during World War II, the synagogue was used as a warehouse.

Under Soviet rule, the synagogue was one of the relatively few allowed to remain open in the Soviet Union. After Latvian independence was restored in 1991, the synagogue was damaged by bombings in 1995 and 1998.

A restoration of the synagogue, partly funded by the European Union and by the Latvian government, was completed in 2009. The dedication ceremony was attended by Latvia's president Valdis Zatlers and prime minister Valdis Dombrovskis as well as by Israeli Diaspora Affairs Minister Yuli-Yoel Edelstein.

== Gallery ==
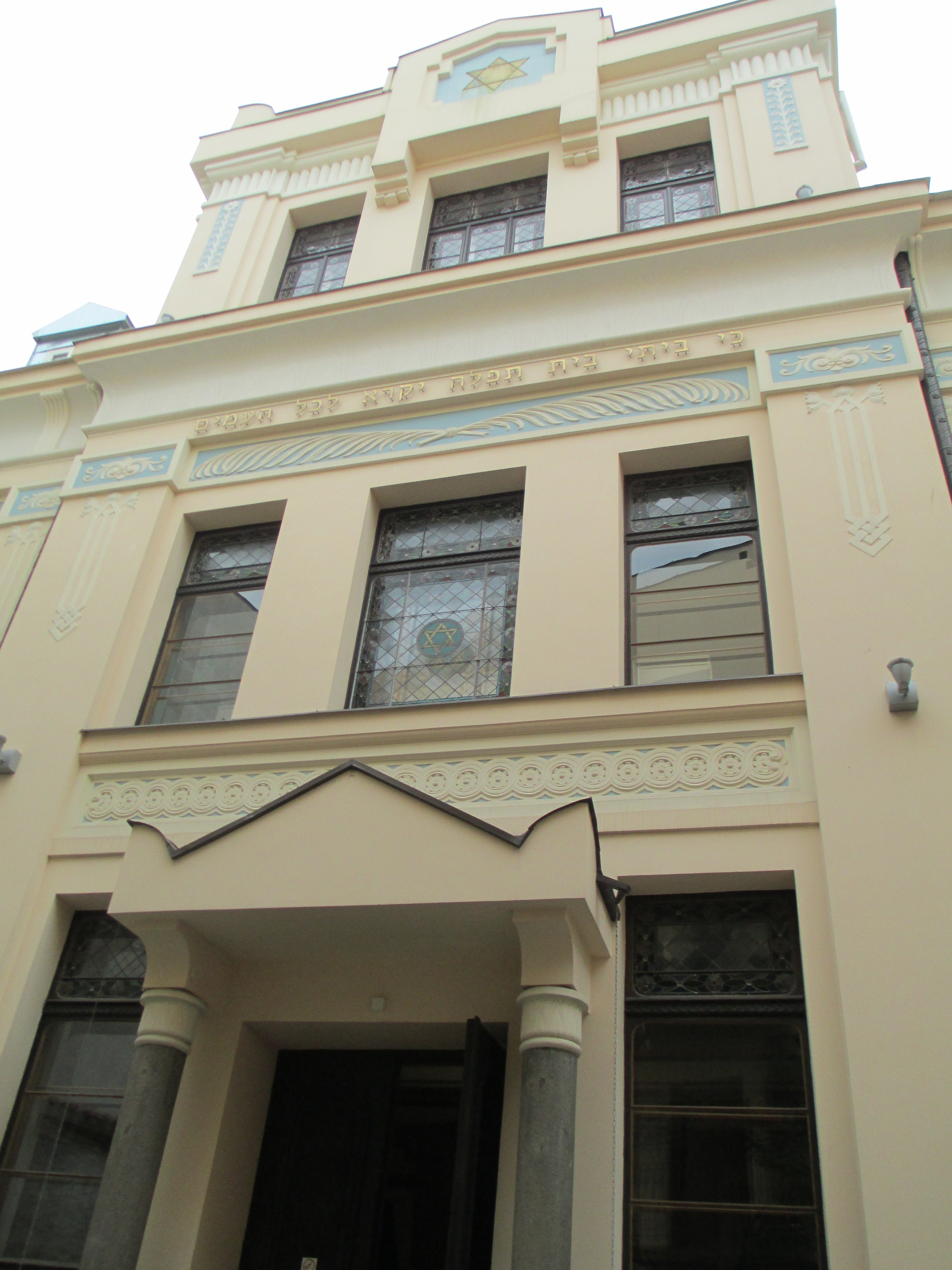

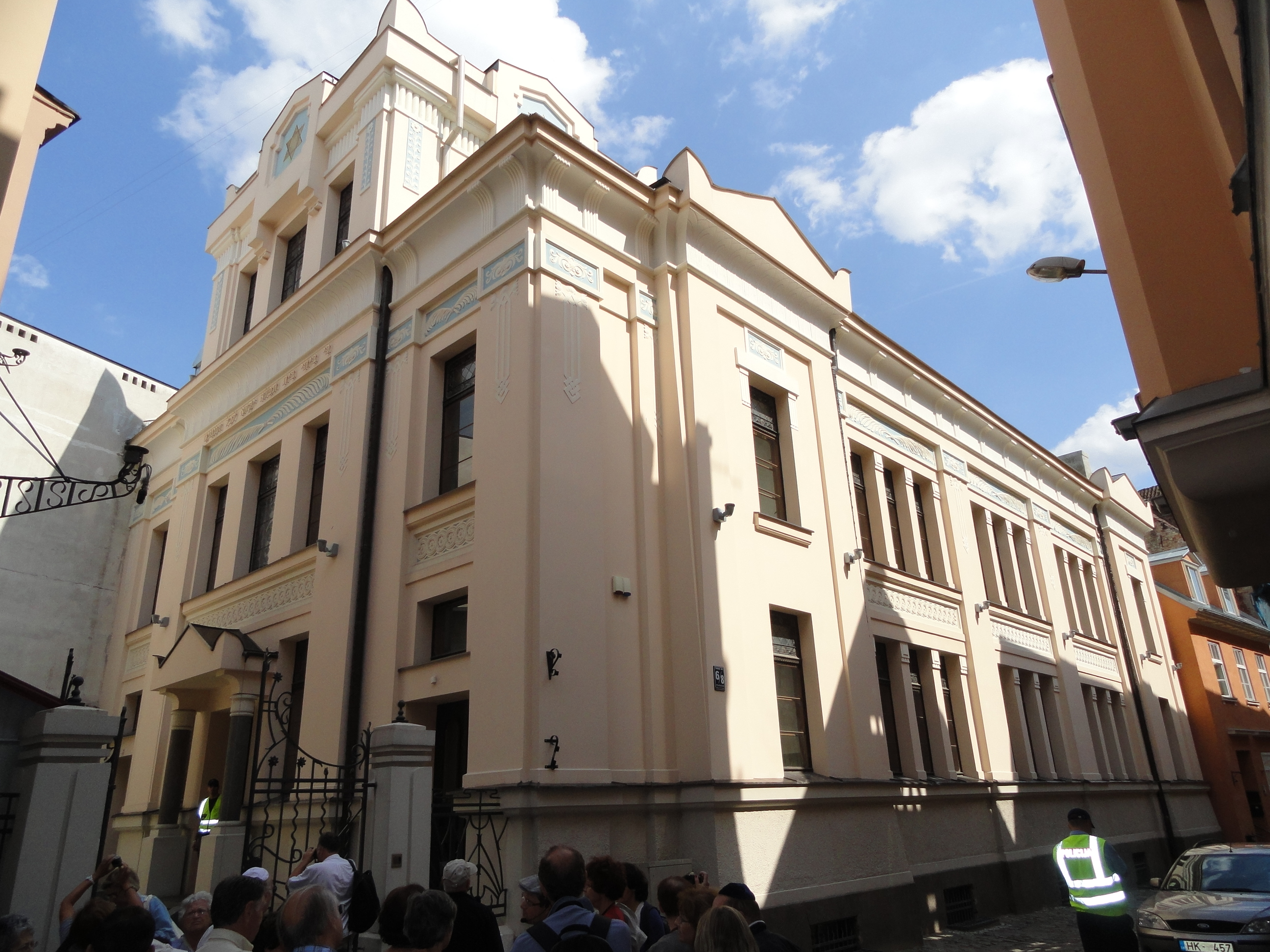

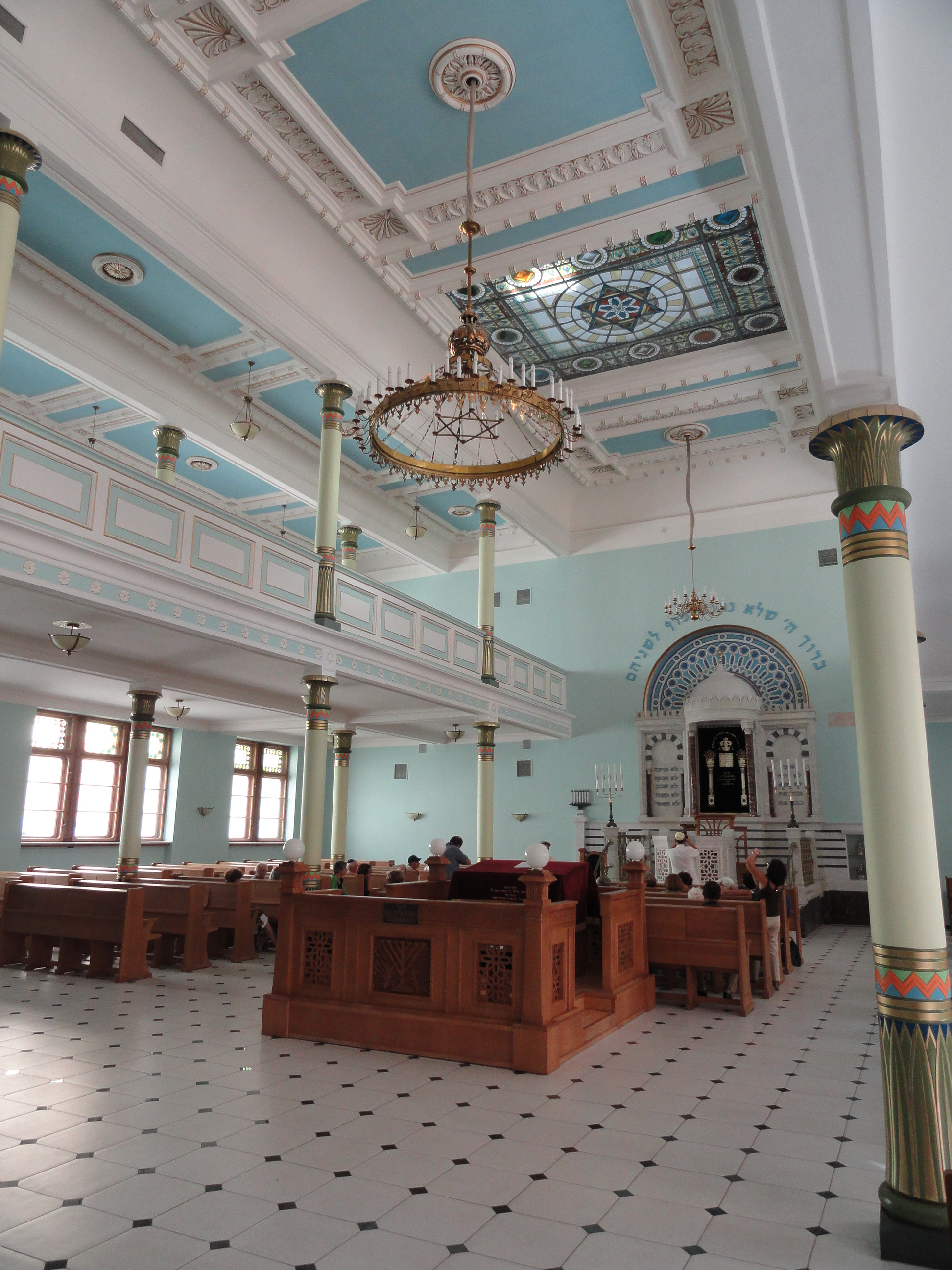

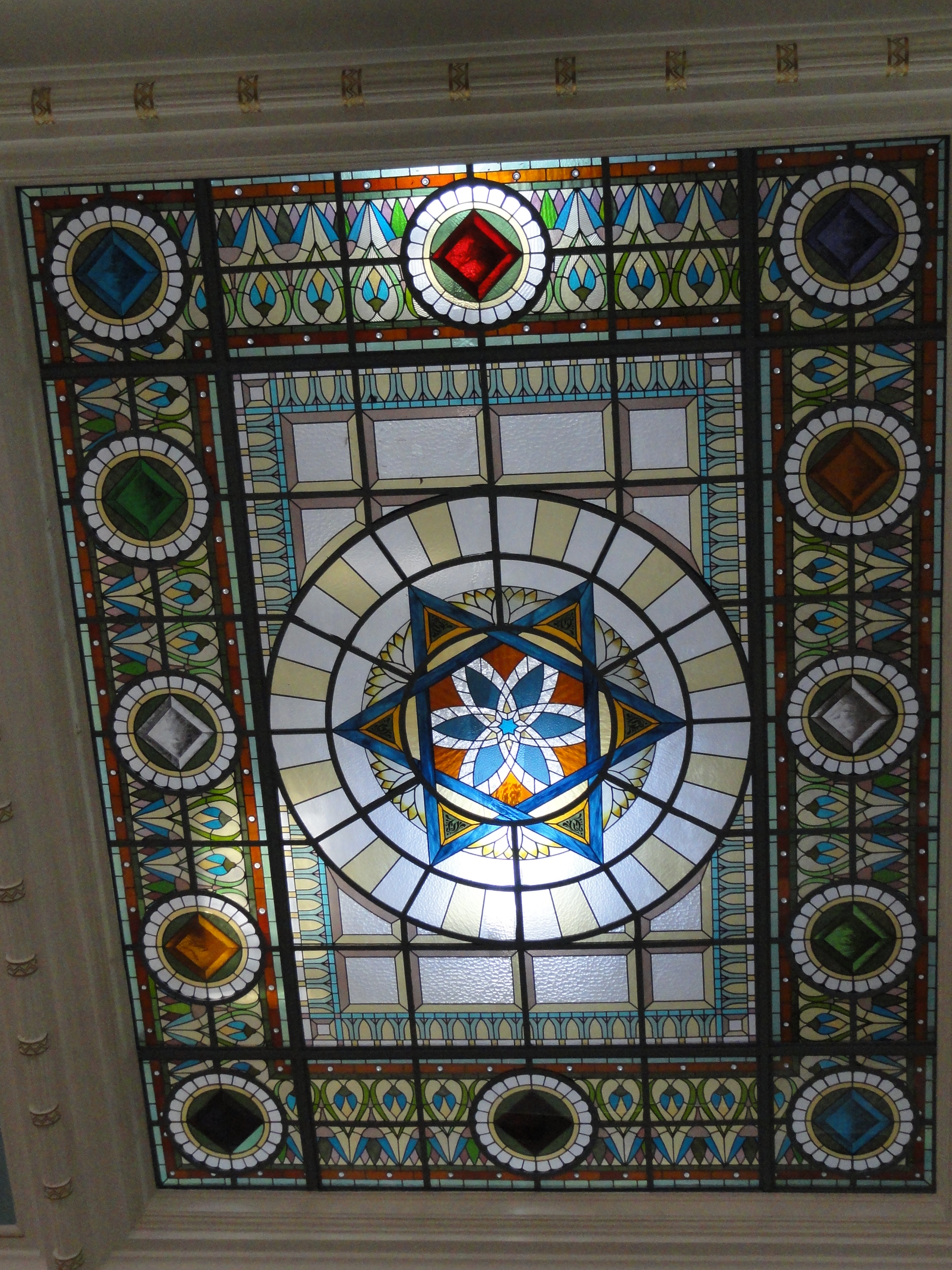

== See also ==
- History of the Jews in Latvia
- List of synagogues in Latvia
