= World War II casualties of the Soviet Union =

Military and civilian casualties of the Soviet Union in World War II

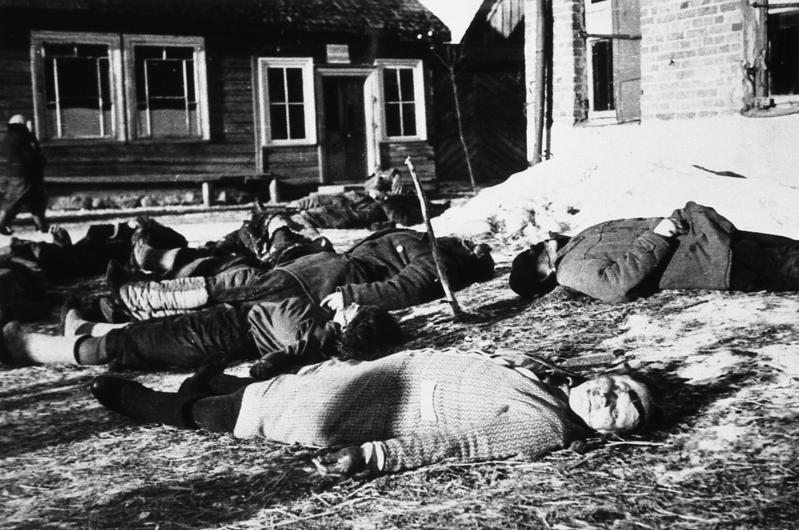
Dead Soviet civilians near Minsk, 1943

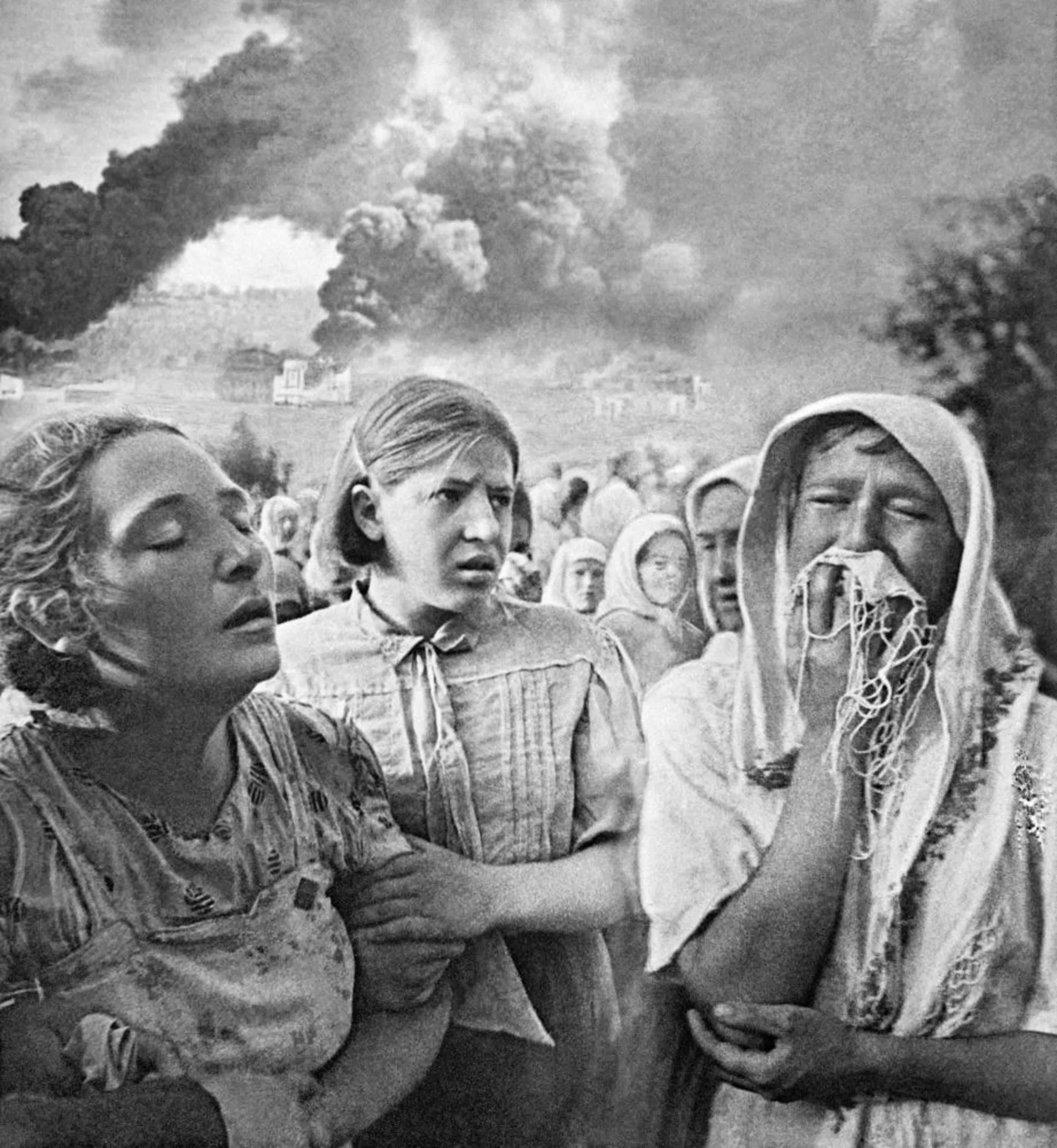
Kiev, 23 June 1941

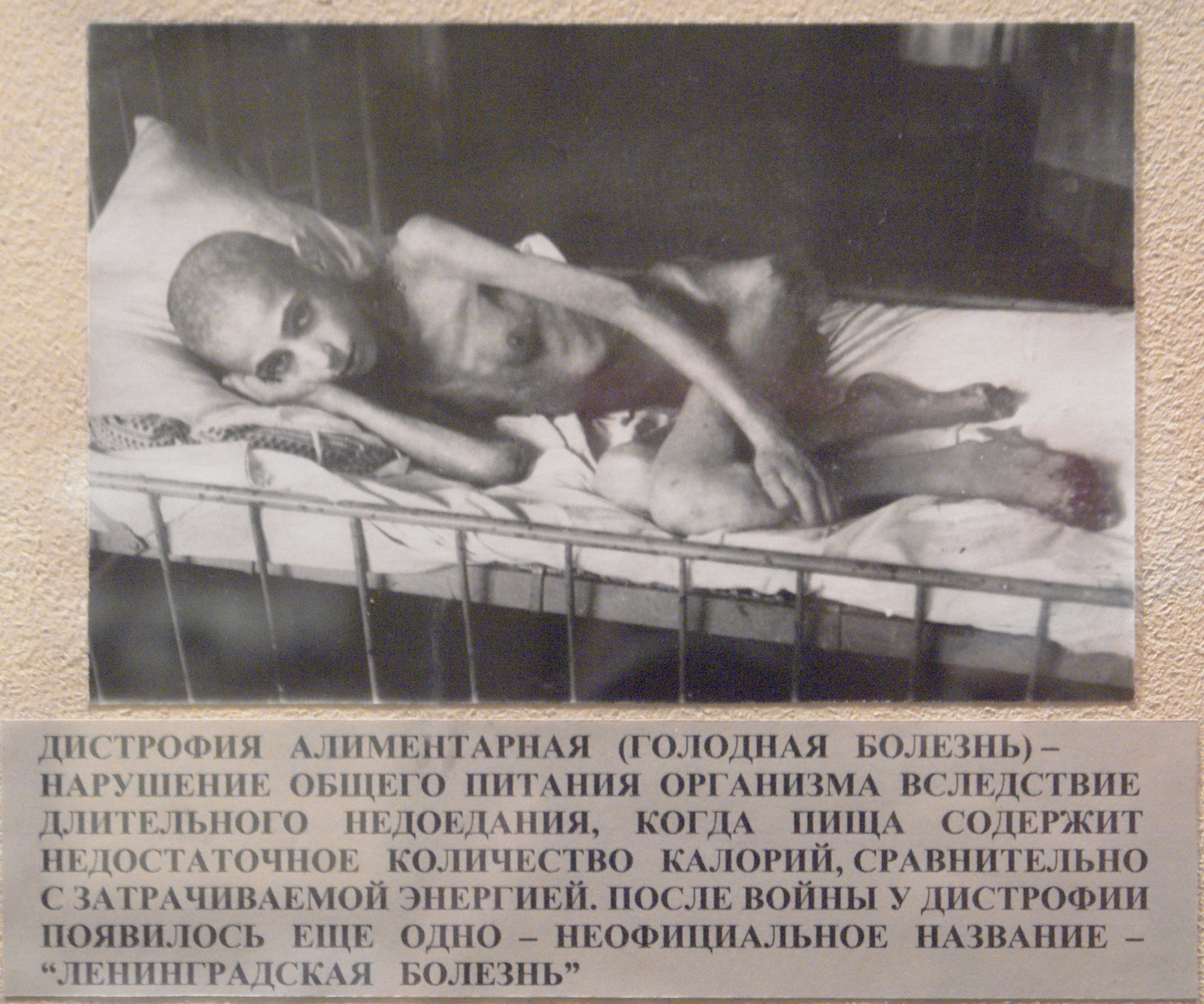
A victim of starvation in besieged Leningrad suffering from muscle atrophy in 1941

The Soviet Union suffered about 27 million losses in World War II, including both civilian and military losses from all war-related causes, although exact figures are disputed. A figure of 20 million was considered official during the Soviet era. The post-Soviet government of Russia puts the Soviet war losses at 26.6 million, on the basis of the 1993 study by the Russian Academy of Sciences, including people dying as a result of effects of the war. This includes 8,668,400 military deaths as calculated by Russia's Ministry of Defence.

The figures published by Russia's Ministry of Defence have been accepted by most historians outside Russia. However, the official figure of 8.7 million military deaths has been disputed by Russian scholars who believe that the number of dead and missing prisoners of war is not correct and new research is necessary to determine actual losses. Officials at Russia's Central Defense Ministry Archive (CDMA) maintain that their database lists the names of roughly 14 million dead and missing service personnel. Russian president Dmitry Medvedev stated in 2009 that more than 2.4 million people are still officially considered missing in action, and that of the 9.5 million persons buried in mass graves, 6 million are unidentified. Some Russian scholars put the total number of losses in the war, both civilian and military, at over 40 million. In 2020, Mikhail Meltyukhov, who works with the Russian federal archival project, stated that 15.9–17.4 million civilians were killed on Soviet territory by Germany and its allies during the war.

== Summary of Russian sources ==
The war-related deaths detailed in Russian sources are as follows:

- The Krivosheev study listed 8,668,400 irreplaceable losses (from listed strength): 5,226,800 killed in action, 1,102,800 died of wounds in field hospitals, 555,500 non combat deaths, POW deaths and missing were 4,559,000. Deductions were 939,700 who "were encircled or missing in action in occupied areas who were reconscripted once areas liberated" and 1,836,000 prisoners of war (POWs) returned from captivity.
- The Krivosheev study listed 500,000 reservists captured by the enemy after being conscripted but before being taken on strength.
- Russian sources report 2,164,000 deaths as civilian "forced labor in Germany". Viktor Zemskov believed that these were actually military deaths not included in the Krivosheev report. Zemskov put the military death toll at 11.5 million. (Note: Zemskov believed that POW deaths and missing were almost 4 million, not the 1.783 reported by Krivosheev.)
- Convicts and deserters listed in the Krivosheev study. 994,300 were sentenced by court martial and 212,400 were reported as deserters. They are not included with the 8,668,000 irreplaceable losses listed by Krivosheev.
- Russian sources list 7.420 million civilians killed in the war; these numbers do not include the siege of Leningrad (1,09 million dead). Sources cited for this figure are from the Soviet period. The figure of 7.4 million has been disputed by Viktor Zemskov who believed that the actual civilian death toll was at least 4.5 million. He maintained that the official figures included POWs, persons who emigrated from the country, persons evacuated during the war counted as missing as well as militia and partisan fighters.
- Russian sources maintain that there were 4.1 million famine deaths in the regions occupied by Germany.
- Gulag prisoners. According to Viktor Zemskov "due to general difficulties in 1941–1945 in the camps, the GULAG and prisons about 1.0 million prisoners died. Anne Applebaum cites Russian sources that put the Gulag death toll from 1941 to 1945 at 932,000.
- Deportations of ethnic minorities. Russian sources put the death toll at 309,000.
- War-related deaths of those born during war – according to Andreev, Darski and Kharkova (ADK), there was an increase in infant mortality of 1.3 million.

== Military losses ==
=== Krivosheev's analysis ===
In 1993, a report by Russia's Ministry of Defense, authored by a group headed by G. F. Krivosheev, detailed military casualties. Their sources were Soviet reports from the field and other archive documents that were secret during the Soviet era, including a secret Soviet General Staff report from 1966 to 1968. Krivosheev's study puts Soviet military dead and missing at 8.7 million and is often cited by historians. Krivosheev maintained that the figure of 8.668 million is correct because it excludes called up reservists that were never inducted, men who were duplicated as conscripts because they were conscripted again into the Soviet army and navy during the war as territories were being liberated and non-combat related causes. The statistic of 8.668 million military dead includes only the combat related deaths of the forces in the field units of the army and navy, (Note: Krivosheev lists the detailed losses for each of the 54 Army fronts and Naval fleets (not including border and security troops). Irrecoverable losses add down to (5,184,749 killed in action, 534,273 non-combat deaths and 4,452,346 POWs and missing). He also lists the following data separately 1,102,800 died of wounds in field hospitals and 1,836,500 POWs who returned to the Soviet Union were deducted from the missing. Not included with the 54 Army fronts and Naval fleets are the losses of 159,100 border and security troops and 267,000 died of illness in field hospitals. The figures for POW & missing do no include an estimated 500,000 reservists captured by the enemy after being conscripted but before being taken on strength. Included in the figures are 994,300 convicted by court martial and 212,400 deserters. These figures are 94,662 civilians in military service, which included women, communications and transport personnel.) and does not include civilian support forces in rear areas, conscripted reservists killed before being listed on active strength, militia units, and Soviet partisan dead, Krivosheev maintained that they should be included with civilian war losses.

Soviet World War II military casualties in 1939–1945 by period
| | Dead and missing | Wounded and sick |
|---|---|---|
| Battle of Khalkhin Gol 1939 | 9,703 | 15,952 |
| Invasion of Poland, 1939 | 1,475 | 2,383 |
| Winter War 1939–40 | 126,875 | 264,908 |
| Invasion of Romania, 1940 | 29 | 69 |
| World War II 1941–45 | 8,668,400 | 22,326,905 (including 14,685,593 wounded and 7,641,312 sick) |
| Total | 8,806,482 | 22,610,217 |

The schedule below summarizes Soviet casualties from 1941 to 1945.

Military dead and missing (1941–45) by cause
| Cause | Estimate |
|---|---|
| KIA or died of wounds | 6,329,600 |
| Missing in action | 500,000 |
| Noncombat deaths of units at the front (sickness, accidents, etc.) | 555,500 |
| Died or killed while POW | 1,283,200 |
| Total irrecoverable losses (from listed strength) | 8,668,400 |

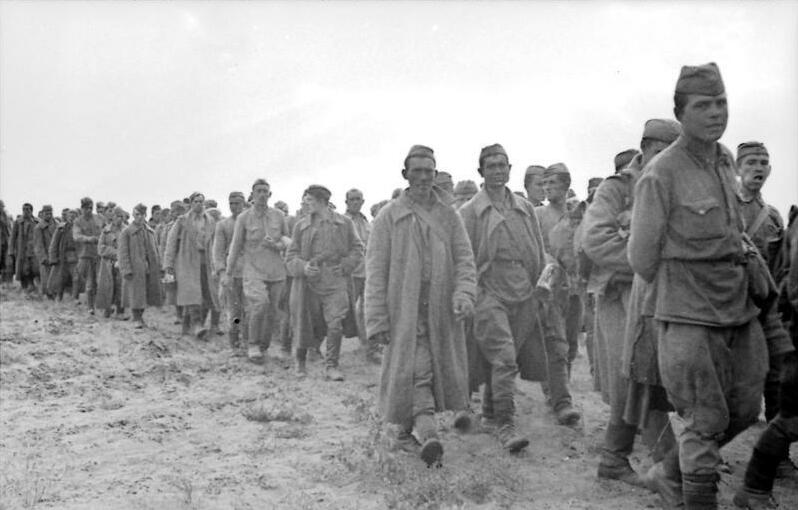
Soviet prisoners of war

Reconciliation of missing
| Missing in action | 500,000 |
| Missing later re-conscripted | 940,000 |
| POW deaths | 1,283,000 |
| POW returned to USSR | 1,836,000 |
| Total reported missing | 4,559,000 |

Krivosheev's analysis shows that 4,559,000 were reported missing (including 3,396,400 per field reports and an additional 1,162,600 estimated based on German documents), out of which 500,000 were missing and presumed dead, 939,700 were re-conscripted during the war as territories were liberated, 1,836,000 returned to the U.S.S.R. after the war, while the balance of 1,283,300 died in German captivity as POWs or did not return to the USSR. Krivosheev wrote: "According to German sources, 673,000 died in captivity. Of the remaining 1,110,300, Soviet sources indicate that over half also died in captivity". Sources published outside of Russia put total POW dead at 3.0 million. Krivosheev maintains that this figure based on German sources includes civilian personnel that were not included in the reports of the army and navy field forces. In a 1999 article, Krivosheev noted that after the war 180,000 liberated POWs did not return to the USSR and most likely settled in other countries, Krivosheev did not mention this in the English language translation of his study. According to declassified documents from the Soviet archives 960,039 surviving Soviet military POW were turned over to the Soviet authorities by the Western powers and 865,735 were released by the Soviet forces in territory they occupied.

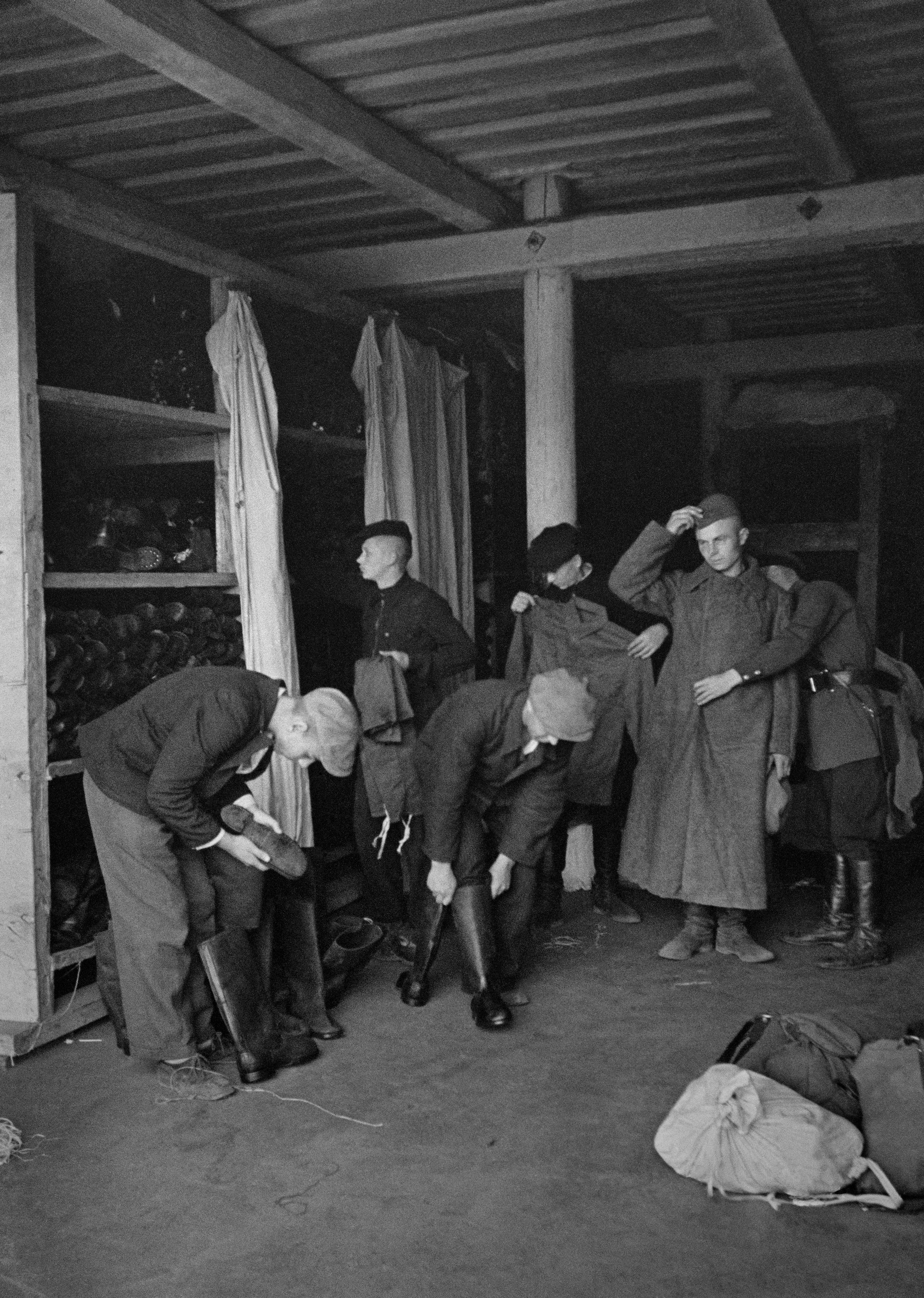
Soviet conscripts, 1941

Reconciliation of Soviet forces 1941–1945
| Description | Balance |
|---|---|
| Army & navy strength – June 1941 | 4,902,000 |
| Drafted during war | 29,575,000 |
| Discharged during war | (9,693,000) |
| Army & navy strength in June 1945 | (12,840,000) |
| Losses of conscripted reservists 1941 not officially inducted | (500,000) |
| Subtotal: operational losses | 11,444,000 |
| Missing later re-conscripted | (940,000) |
| Liberated POW returned to USSR | (1,836,000) |
| Total losses | 8,668,000 |

- Discharged during war of 9,693,000 includes 3,798,200 sent on sick leave; 3,614,600 transferred to work in industry, anti-aircraft defense and armed guards; 1,174,600 sent to NKVD troops and organs; 250,400 transferred to Polish, Czechoslovak and Romanian armies; 436,600 imprisoned; 206,000 discharged; and 212,400 not found after deserting, detached from troop convoy or missing in military districts in the interior.
- During the war 422,700 men were sent to penal units at the front and not discharged.

The June 1945 force strength of 12,840,000 included 11,390,600 on active service; 1,046,000 in hospital; and 403,200 in civilian departments.

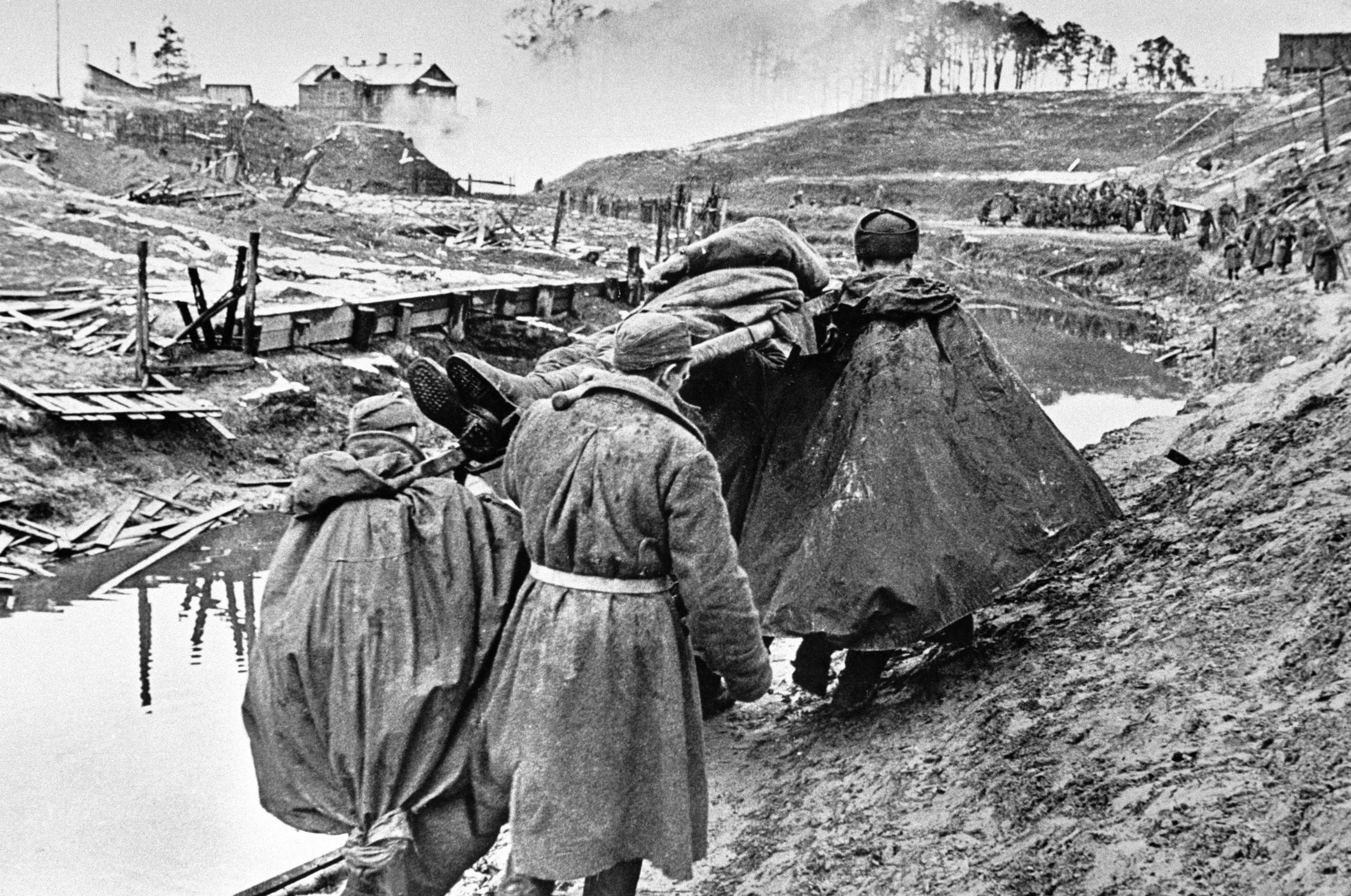
Carrying a wounded soldier on the Leningrad Front

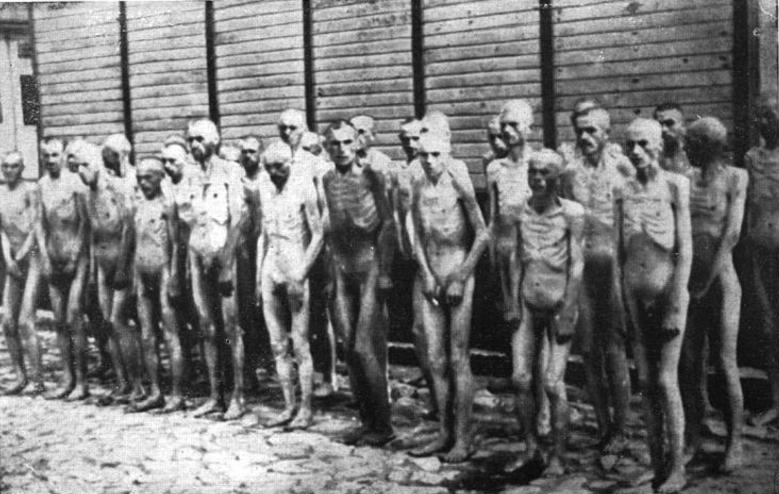
Naked Soviet prisoners of war in Mauthausen concentration camp.

Numbers of wounded & sick by category according to Military Medical Service
| | Wounded | Sick | Total |
|---|---|---|---|
| Total | 14,685,593 | 7,641,312 | 22,326,905 |
| Of these: | | | |
| Discharged | (3,050,733) | (747,425) | (3,798,158) |
| Returned to duty | (10,530,750) | (6,626,493) | (17,157,243) |
| Died (also included in irrecoverable losses) | (1,104,110) | (267,394) | (1,371,504) |

Casualties in 1941–1945 according to field reports
| Description | Irrecoverable losses | Wounded & sick | Total losses |
|---|---|---|---|
| 1941 3rd Q | 2,129,677 | 687,626 | 2,817,303 |
| 1941 4th Q | 1,007,996 | 648,521 | 1,656,517 |
| 1942 1st Q | 675,315 | 1,179,457 | 1,854,772 |
| 1942 2nd Q | 842,898 | 706,647 | 1,549,545 |
| 1942 3rd Q | 1,224,495 | 1,283,062 | 2,507,557 |
| 1942 4th Q | 515,508 | 941,896 | 1,457,404 |
| 1943 1st Q | 726,714 | 1,425,692 | 2,152,406 |
| 1943 2nd Q | 191,904 | 490,637 | 682,541 |
| 1943 3rd Q | 803,856 | 2,060,805 | 2,864,661 |
| 1943 4th Q | 589,955 | 1,567,940 | 2,157,895 |
| 1944 1st Q | 570,761 | 1,572,742 | 2,143,503 |
| 1944 2nd Q | 344,258 | 965,208 | 1,309,466 |
| 1944 3rd Q | 510,790 | 1,545,442 | 2,056,232 |
| 1944 4th Q | 338,082 | 1,031,358 | 1,369,440 |
| 1945 1st Q | 557,521 | 1,594,635 | 2,152,156 |
| 1945 2nd Q | 243,296 | 618,055 | 861,351 |
| Campaign in Far East | 12,031 | 24,425 | 36,456 |
| Subtotal operational losses: army & navy | 11,285,057 | 18,344,148 | 29,629,205 |
| Add: losses border/internal service troops | 159,100 | | |
| Subtotal: operational losses | 11,444,100 | | |
| Less: missing later re-conscripted | (939,700) | | |
| Less: liberated POW returned to USSR | (1,836,000) | | |
| Total irrecoverable losses | 8,668,400 | | |

Krivosheev's group estimated losses for the early part of the war, because from 1941 to 1942 no surrounded or defeated divisions reported their casualties.

Total wounded and sick includes 15,205,592 wounded, 3,047,675 sick and 90,881 frostbite cases. Included in the total of 11.444 million irrecoverable losses are 1,100,327 died of wounds in hospital.

Field reports stated the number of wounded and sick as 18,344,148, while the records of the military medical service show a total of 22,326,905. According to Krivosheev the difference can be explained by the fact that the medical service included sick personnel who did not take part in the fighting.

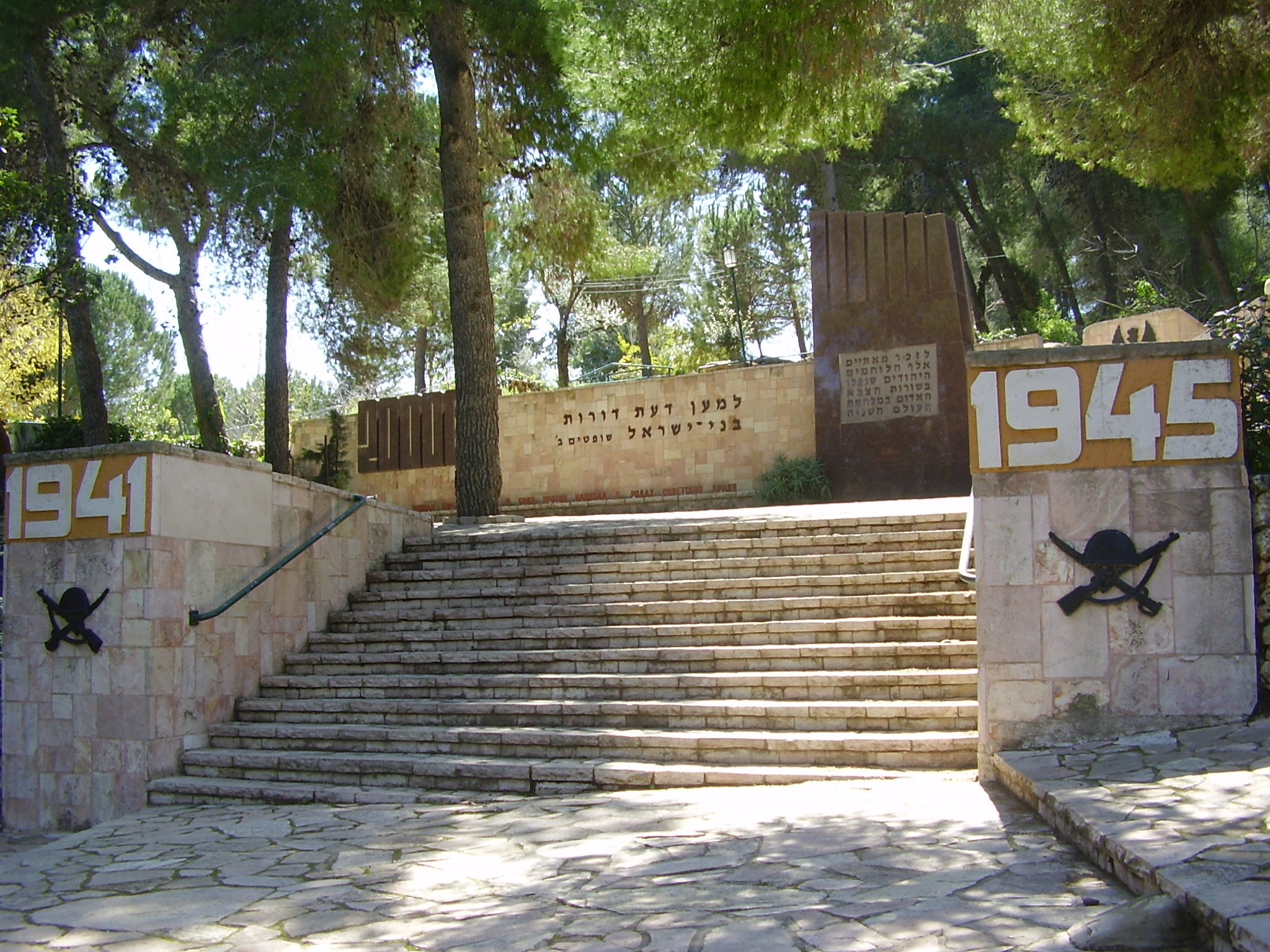
Monument in Israel to Jewish war dead in the Soviet army

Total losses by age group
| Age group | Total losses | % of total losses |
|---|---|---|
| Under 20 years | 1,560,000 | 18.0 |
| 21–25 | 1,907,000 | 22.0 |
| 26–30 | 1,517,000 | 17.5 |
| 31–35 | 1,430,200 | 16.5 |
| 36–40 | 1,040,200 | 12 |
| 41–45 | 693,500 | 8 |
| 46–50 | 433,400 | 5 |
| over 50 years | 86,700 | 1 |
| All age groups | 8,668,400 | 100 |

=== Criticism of Krivosheev's analysis ===
Krivosheev's analysis has been disputed by independent scholars in Russia. His critics maintain that he underestimated the number of missing in action and POW deaths and deaths of service personnel in rear area hospitals. Makhmut Gareev, former Deputy Chief of the General Staff of the Armed Forces of the USSR, maintains that the published information on Soviet casualties is the work of the individual authors and not based on official data. According to Gareev the Russian government has not disclosed the actual losses in the war.

- The data listed in the Krivosheev study has been disputed, S. N. Mikhalev put the losses of the combat forces at 10,922,000 Historian Viktor Zemskov estimated total military dead at 11.5 million. In his book Christian Hartmann puts the total at 11.4 million. Some researchers in Russia put the total demographic losses of the military at nearly 14.0 million. S. N. Mikahlev put total losses at 13.7 million S.A.Il'Enkov at the Russian military archives believes total losses were 13.850 million.
- Krivosheev's critics maintain that he underestimated the numbers of missing and POWs. According to Viktor Zemskov total POW dead were 2.3 million and the number missing in action 1.5 million, 2.2 million more than Krivosheev. He noted that the figure includes military prisoners as well as militias, guerrillas, special units of various civil departments. S.N. Mikhalev maintained that Krivosheev understated irrecoverable losses by 2.254 million Data published in Russia indicate Soviet POW losses of 2,543,000 (5,734,000 were captured, 821,000 released into German service with the German military and 2,371,000 liberated)
- 1,046,000 sent to hospital were deducted from the total strength at the end of the war. In Krivosheev's figures 3,798,000 personnel were discharged for medical reasons of whom 2,576,000 became invalids. Kiriosheev does not include the balance of 1,222,000 with the war dead. S. A. Il'Enkov, an official at the Russian Military Archives, maintained that the "complex military situation at the front did not always allow for the conduct of a full accounting of losses, especially in the first years of the war". He pointed out that the reports from the field units did not include deaths in rear area hospitals of wounded and sick personnel. S.N Mikhalev put total losses at 13.7 million, based on his analysis of Ministry of Defense documents that a total of 2.6 million service personnel died of sickness or wounds in hospitals, 1.5 million more than the figure in the Krivosheev study.
- 994,300 Personnel convicted of offenses, according to Krivosheev 422,700, were sent to "penal sub-units at the front". S.N. Mikhalev maintained that the penal sub-units are not included with the casualties reported by the forces in the field. According to S.N. Mikhalev 135,000 service personnel were executed after being convicted, he believed that they are not included with the non-combat losses of the frontal units. Krivosheev maintains that those executed are included with non-combat losses of the field forces. Krivosheev lists an additional 436,600 personnel as being "imprisoned" during the war and were deducted from the total on active duty at the end of the war. However S.N. Mikhalev includes those imprisoned with irrecoverable losses

==== POW deaths ====
Western scholars estimate 3.3 million dead out of 5.7 million total Soviet POW captured. According to German figures 5,734,000 Soviet POWs were taken Between 22 June 1941 and the end of the war, roughly 5.7 million members of the Red Army fell into German hands. In January 1945, 930,000 were still in German camps. A million at most had been released, most of whom were so-called ‘volunteers’ (Hilfswillige) for (often compulsory) auxiliary service in the Wehrmacht. Another 500,000, as estimated by the Army High Command, had either fled or been liberated. The remaining 3,300,000 (57.5 percent of the total) had perished.". However, according to Krivosheev the Germans claimed to have captured up to 5.750 million POWs, he maintains that the figures in Nazi propaganda included civilians and military reservists that were caught up in the German encirclement's. Krivosheev puts the number of Soviet military POW that actually were sent to the camps at 4,059,000. Krivosheev maintained that the figure of 3.0 million POW dead reported in western sources included partisans, militia and civilian men of military age taken as POWs in the early stages of the war in 1941. In addition to the German-held POW Romania captured 82,090 Soviet POWs, 5,221 died, 3,331 escaped, and 13,682 were released Finland captured 64,188 Soviet POWs, at least 18,318 were documented to have died in Finnish prisoner of war camps.

==== Analysis of S. N. Mikhalev ====
In 2000, S. N. Mikhalev published a study of Soviet casualties. From 1989 to 1996 he was an associate of the Institute of Military History of the Ministry of Defence. Mikhalev disputed Krivosheev's figure of 8.7 million military war dead, he put Soviet military dead at more than 10.9 million persons based on his analysis of those conscripted. He maintained that the official figures could not be reconciled to the total men drafted and that POW deaths were understated. Mikhalev put the total irreplaceable losses at 13.7 million; he believed that the official figures understated POW and missing losses, that the deaths of service personnel convicted of offenses were not included with the overall losses and that the number who died of wounds was understated.

Reconciliation of conscripted persons
| Description | Krivosheev | Mikhalev | | Difference |
|---|---|---|---|---|
| Army & navy – June 1941 | 4,902,000 | 4,704,000 | (Note: Mikhalev excludes Construction troops whose casualties were not included in the field reports.) | (198,000) |
| Drafted during war (Note: Excludes those drafted twice.) | 29,575,000 | 29,575,000 | | 0 |
| Discharged during war (Note: Krivosheev includes those sent on sick leave, those sent to industry, NKVD or foreign units and 436,600 imprisoned after sentencing. Mikhalev maintains that this figure includes personnel who died in hospital of wounds and sickness and the deaths of those convicted of offenses.) | (9,693,000) | (9,693,000) | | 0 |
| Army & navy – June 1945 | (12,840,000) | (11,999,000) | (Note: Mikhalev excludes 403,000 Construction troops whose casualties were not included in the field reports and 437,000 imprisoned after sentencing already deducted in number of discharged) | 841,000 |
| Conscripted reservists | (500,000) | 0 | (Note: Mikhalev maintains that they were military operational losses that should be included with total casualties) | 500,000 |
| Subtotal: operational losses | 11,444,000 | 12,587,000 | | 1,143,000 |
| MIA re-conscripted (Note: MIA Re-conscripted were men conscripted back into the Soviet army during the war as territories were being liberated. Mikhalev maintains that they should not be deducted because were included in the Red Army strength in June 1945 and that the number conscripted excludes those drafted twice.) | (940,000) | 0 | | 940,000 |
| Liberated POW returned to USSR | (1,836,000) | (1,836,000) | | 0 |
| Losses of NKVD & border troops (Note: NKVD & Border Troops -Mikhalev adds these losses to the total because they were not part of the Red Army balance in June 1945.) | 0 | 159,000 | | 159,000 |
| Losses in the Far East August 1945 | 0 | 12,000 | (Note: Mikhalev adds these losses to the total because they were not part of the Red Army balance in June 1945) | 12,000 |
| Total irrecoverable losses | 8,668,000 | 10,922,000 | (Note: In addition Mikhalev believed that an additional 1.8 million deaths in hospital of wounded and sick personnel and 1.0 million convicted of offenses should be added to the total irreplaceable losses) | 2,254,000 |

==== Convicted of offences by Soviet military ====
S. N. Mikhalev included in his figure irrecoverable losses the deaths of 994,300 Soviet military personnel that were convicted of offences during the course of the war (422,700 sent to penal battalions, 135,000 executed and 436,600 imprisoned)

==== Russian Military Archives database ====
An alternative method is to determine losses from the Russian Military Archives database of individual war dead. S. A. Il'Enkov, an official at the Russian Military Archives, maintained that the "complex military situation at the front did not always allow for the conduct of a full accounting of losses, especially in the first years of the war" He pointed out that in the reports from the field units did not include deaths in rear area hospitals of wounded personnel. Il'Enkov maintained that the information in the Russian Military Archives alphabetical card-indexes "is a priceless treasure of history, which can assist in resolving the problems of the price of Soviet victory" Il'Enkov maintained it could provide an accurate accounting of war losses. He concluded by stating, "We established the number of irreplaceable losses of our Armed Forces at the time of the Great Patriotic War of about 13,850,000. Krivosheev maintained that the database of individual war dead is unreliable because some personnel records are duplicated and others omitted.

==== Critics ====
Critics of the official figures by Russia's Ministry of Defense base their arguments on self analyses of documents in the Soviet archives and demographic models of the Soviet population during the Stalin era.

- In 2020, historian Mikhail Meltyukhov, who works with the Russian federal archival project, stated that 15.9–17.4 million civilians were killed on Soviet territory by the Nazis during World War II.
- On 14 February 2017, at a hearing of the Russian State Duma, a presentation by legislator Nikolai Zemtsov, a member of the non-governmental organization Immortal Regiment of Russia, maintained that documents of the now defunct Soviet Gosplan indicated that Soviet war dead were almost 42 million (19 million military and 23 million civilians). However scholars believe that these figures are without serious foundation.
- Viktor Zemskov maintained that the population loss due to the war was 20 million, including 16 million direct losses and 4 million deaths due to the deterioration in living conditions. He maintains that the Russian Academy of Science figure of 26.6 million total war dead includes about 7 million deaths due to natural causes based on the mortality rate that prevailed before the war. Zemskov maintains that military dead numbered 11.5 million, including nearly 4 million POWs. He maintains that the figure of 6.8 million civilian deaths in occupied regions was overstated because it included persons who were evacuated to the rear areas. He submitted an estimate of 4.5 million civilians who were Nazi victims or were killed in the occupied zone. Zemskov maintains that the government figure of 2.1 million civilian deaths due to forced labor in Germany was inflated compared to German wartime records that put the deaths of forced workers at 200,000.
- Mark Solonin maintains that Krivosheev covered up casualties that were three to four times greater than Germany's. Solonin claimed that Russian official sources that list deaths of 13.7 million civilians due to the German occupation include victims of Stalinist repression. He points out that the current figures for civilian war dead are taken from Soviet-era sources. Solonin estimates total losses as somewhat under 20 million. Military dead numbered at least 10.7 million, (Note: including 7.4 million killed; 2.54 million POWs; 400,000 non-combat dead and 380,000 executed by Soviets) excluding 2.18 million soldiers who are unaccounted for, half of whom he assumed died. He asserted that some deserted or emigrated and that a higher death toll is possible. Solonin's estimate is that 5–6 million civilians were killed by the invaders (including 2.83 million Jews) and over 1 million civilians perished in the Siege of Leningrad and in Stalingrad. He claimed that 6–9 million Soviets fell to Stalin's repressions, although in contemporary Russian official sources they are included with civilian war dead.
- In 2017, the Russian historian Igor Ivlev put Soviet war dead at 42 million people (19.4 million military and 22.6 million civilians). According to Ivlev, Soviet State Planning Committee documents put the Soviet population at 205 million in June 1941 and 169.8 million for June 1945. Taking into account the 17.6 million births and 10.3 million natural deaths, leaving almost 42 million in war-related losses according to his research. The details of Ivlev's calculations were first announced at a parliamentary readings about the number of losses of the USSR during the Great Patriotic War. Ivlev's figures are endorsed by the Russian civic organization Immortal Regiment and have been discussed in the Russian media recently. Ivlev has published a summary of his arguments on the Russian website Demoscope Weekly. According to Ivlev's calculations based on the number of Soviet Communist party and Komsomol members conscripted, military dead and missing were 17.8 million.
- Lev Lopukhovsky and Boris Kavalerchik label Krivosheev's transfer of military casualties to civilian losses as "ingratitude and blasphemy over their cherished memory". They demanded that the Russian government reinvestigate the matter. They state that Krivosheev's group understated losses in the crucial period of 1941–1942.
- In 1996, Boris Sokolov published a study that estimated total war dead at 43.3 million including 26.4 million in the military. Sokolov's calculations claimed that official population figures in 1941 were understated by 12.7 million and the population in 1946 overstated by 4.0 million, yielding 16.7 million additional war dead, bringing the total to 43.3 million.
- V. E. Korol estimated overall Soviet war dead at 46 million including military dead of 23 million. He claimed that the official figure of 8.7 million military dead was "groundless", based on battle accounts from across the Eastern Front. Korol held that the official figures of Krivosheev were an attempt to cover up the disregard for human life by the military leaders under Stalin. Korol cited Soviet authors writing during the glasnost era that put wartime losses much higher than the official figures; In 1990, General I. A. Gerasimov published information from the Russian Military Archives database that put losses at 16.2 million enlisted men and 1.2 million officers. Korol also cited historian-archivist Iu. Geller who put losses at 46 million, including military dead of 23 million. and A.N. Mertsalov's estimate of 14 million military dead based on documents in the Russian Military Archives.
- Hypothetical population loss for children unborn due to the war– Some Russian writers have argued that war losses should also include the hypothetical population loss for children unborn due to the war; using this methodology total losses would be about 46 million.
- A compilation made in March 2008 of the individuals listed in the card files put total dead and missing at 14,241,000 (13,271,269 enlisted men and 970,000 officers)

==== Male war dead ====
Andreev, Darski and Karkova (ADK) put total losses at 26.6 million. The authors did not dispute Krivoshev's report of 8.7 million military dead. Their demographic study estimated the total war dead of 26.6 million included 20.0 million males and 6.6 million females. In mid-1941 the USSR hosted 8.3 million more females; by 1946 this gap had grown to 22.8 million, an increase of 13.5 million.

== Civilian losses ==
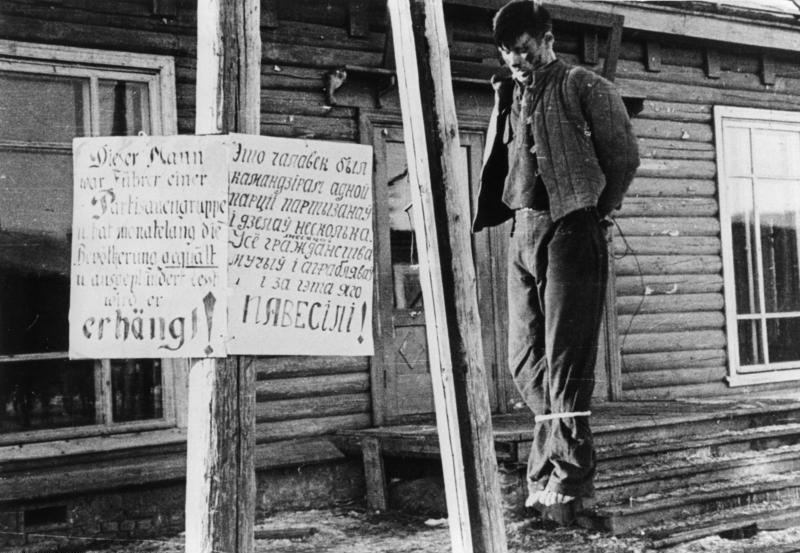
Executed partisan, Minsk

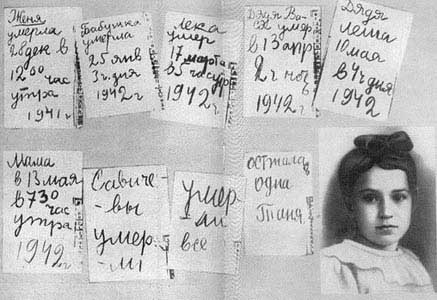
Tanya Savicheva's diary

A 1995 paper published by M.V. Filimoshin, an associate of the Russian Defense Ministry, put the civilian death toll in the regions occupied by Germany at 13.7 million. Filimoshin cited sources from the Soviet era to support his figures and used the terms "genocide" and "premeditated extermination" when referring to deaths of 7.4 million civilians caused by direct, intentional violence. Civilians killed in reprisals during the Soviet partisan war account for a major portion. Filimoshin estimated that civilian forced laborer deaths in Germany totaled 2.1 million. Germany had a policy of forced confiscation of food that resulted in famine deaths of an estimated 6% of the population, or 4.1 million. Russian government sources currently cite these civilian casualty figures in their official statements.

Russian Academy of Science estimate
| Deaths caused by the result of direct, intentional actions of violence | 7,420,135 (Note: The Russian Academy of Science article by M.V. Filimoshin based this figure on sources published in the Soviet era. (However the 2001 edition of Krivosheev put the figure at 7,420.379)) |
| Deaths of forced laborers in Germany | 2,164,313 |
| Deaths due to famine and disease in the occupied regions | 4,100,000 (Note: The Russian Academy of Science article by M.V. Filimoshin estimated 6% of the population in the occupied regions died due to war related famine and disease.) |
| Total | 13,684,448 |

- The sources cited for these figures are from the Soviet period. The Statistic of 7.420 million civilian war dead has been disputed by Viktor Zemskov who believed that the actual civilian death toll was at least 4.5 million. He maintained that the official figures included POWs, persons who emigrated from the country and militia/partisan fighters. According to his analysis the forced laborer death figure of 2.164 million includes the balance of losses not reported in Krivosheev's figure of 8.668 million military war dead, including POWs
- Civilian losses include 57,000 killed in bombing raids (40,000 Stalingrad and 17,000 Leningrad).
- Russian sources include Jewish Holocaust deaths among total civilian dead. Gilbert put Jewish losses at one million within 1939 borders; Holocaust deaths in the annexed territories numbered an additional 1.5 million, bringing total Jewish losses to 2.5 million.
- Civilian losses include deaths in the siege of Leningrad. According to David Glantz the 1945 Soviet estimate presented at the Nuremberg Trials was 642,000 civilian deaths. He noted that Soviet era source from 1965 put the number of dead in the Siege of Leningrad at "greater than 800,000" and that a Russian source from 2000 put the number of dead at 1,000,000. Other Russian historians put the Leningrad death toll at between 1.4 and 2.0 million.
- Russian sources maintain that there were 4.1 million famine deaths in the regions occupied by Germany. Russian sources also report 2.5 to 3.2 million Soviet civilians who died due to famine and disease in non-occupied territory of the USSR, which was caused by wartime shortages in the rear areas.
- These casualties are for 1941–1945 within the 1946–1991 borders of the USSR. Included with civilian losses are deaths in the territories annexed by the USSR in 1939–1940 including 600,000 in the Baltic states and 1,500,000 in Eastern Poland (500,000 ethnic Poles and 1 million Jews).
- Documents from the Soviet archives number the total deaths of prisoners in the Gulag from 1941 to 1945 at 621,637. In a 1995 report Viktor Zemskov noted "due to general difficulties in 1941–1945 in the camps, the GULAG, and prisons, about 1.0 million prisoners died.

== Total population losses ==
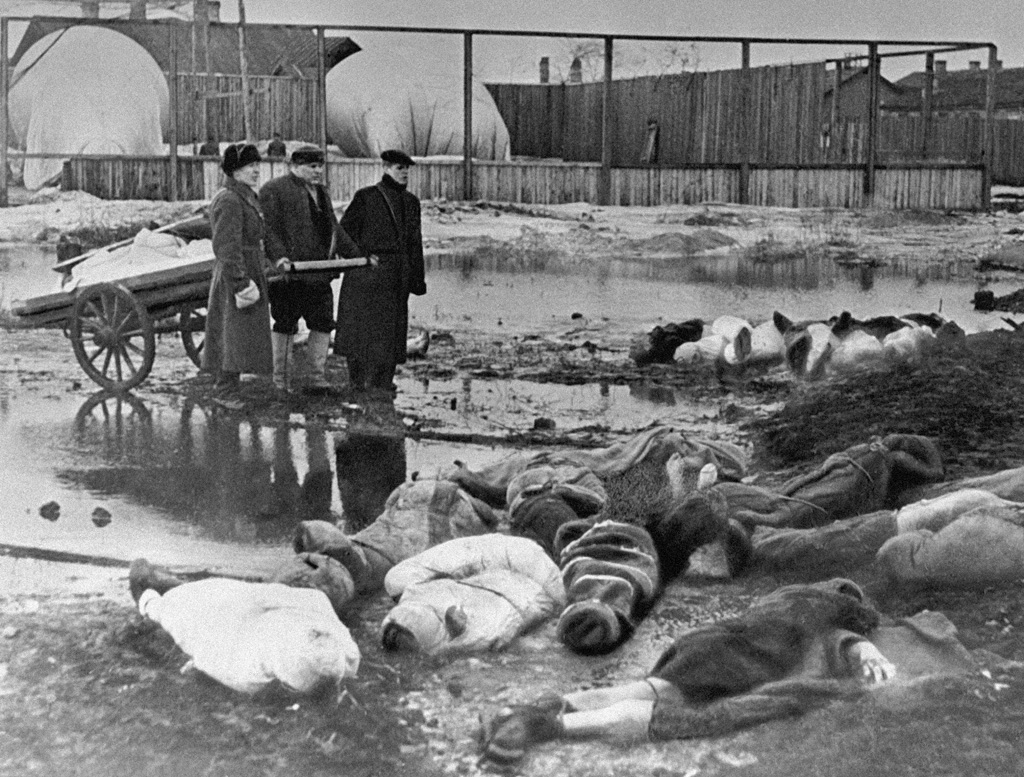
Three men burying victims of the siege of Leningrad in the Volkovo Cemetery, 1 October 1942

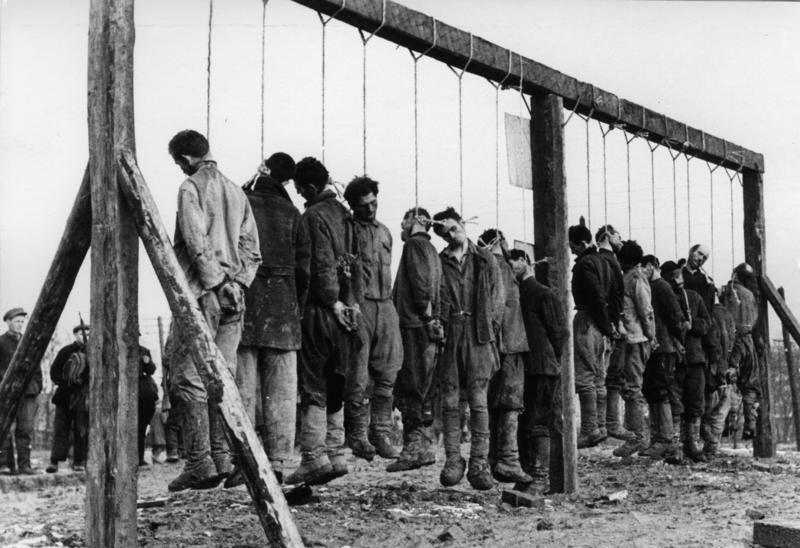
Soviet partisans hanged near Minsk, 20 January 1943

=== Demographic studies of the population losses ===
==== Studies by Andreev, Darski and Kharkova ====
Population pyramid before and after the Second World War (ADK)

1941

1946

E. M. Andreev, L. E. Darski and T. L. Kharkova ("ADK") authored The Population of the Soviet Union 1922–1991, which was published by the Russian Academy of Science in 1993. Andreev worked in the Department of Demography Research Institute of the Central Statistical Bureau (now the Research Institute of Statistics of Federal State Statistical Service of Russia). The study estimated total Soviet war losses of 26.6 million. As of 2015, this was the official Russian government figure for total losses. These losses are a demographic estimate rather than an exact accounting.

Total Soviet losses by demographic balance (1941–45) per (ADK)
| Population in June 1941 | 196,700,000 |
| Births during war | 12,300,000 |
| Death by natural causes during war of those alive before war | (11,900,000) |
| War related deaths of those alive before war | (25,300,000) |
| War related deaths of those born during war | (1,300,000) |
| Total population on 1 January 1946 | 170,500,000 |

Notes:

- According to Andreev, Darski and Kharkova (ADK) the total population loss due to the war was 26.6 million (1941–1945). They maintain that between 9-10 million of the total Soviet war dead were due to the worsening of life conditions in the entire USSR, including the region that was not occupied. The total loss of 26.6 million is based on the assumptions that the wartime increase in infant mortality was 1.3 million and that persons dying of natural causes declined during the war. Overall the annual mortality rate (persons dying of natural causes) declined from 2.17% in 1940 to 1.58% in 1946. The decline in persons dying of natural causes during the war was due to the fact that a disproportionate number of adults, especially men were killed during the war, than those persons under 18 and women who survived. The figure for births during the war is based on a post war survey of the total fertility rate which put the number of births during the war at about one half of the prewar level. The main areas of uncertainty were the estimated figures for the population in the territories annexed from 1939 to 1945 and the loss of population due to emigration during and after the war. The figures include victims of Soviet repression and the deaths of Soviet citizens in German military service. Michael Haynes noted, "We do not know the total number of deaths as a result of the war and related policies". We do know that the demographic estimate of excess deaths was 26.6 million plus an additional 11.9 million natural deaths of persons born before the war and 4.2 million children born during the war that would have occurred in peacetime, bringing the total dead to 42.7 million. At this time the actual total number of deaths caused by the war is unknown since among the 16.1 million "natural deaths" some would have died peacefully and others as a result of the war.
- Civilian deaths were detailed in the Russian study - Human Losses of the USSR in the Period of WWII: Civilian deaths by intentional actions of violence 7,420,000; Deaths of forced laborers 2,164,000; Deaths due to famine and disease 8,500,000 (including 4.1 million in the occupied territories).
- The official total military dead per the analysis of Krivosheev is 8,668,000. Russia's Ministry of Defense maintains that their figure of 8.668 million is correct based on a reconciliation of those conscripted. The official toll of 2,164,000 forced laborers dead could include POWs considered civilians by the military. Critics of Krivosheev maintain that the war dead should include an additional 2.9 million persons, according to their analysis the number of POWs and missing was understated in the official figures. Viktor Zemskov puts total military dead (1941–45) at 11.5 million. A 2013 academic study put Soviet military dead at 11.4 million.
- In addition to the war dead there were 622,000 persons who remained abroad after the war.
- Births and natural deaths during war are rough estimates since vital statistics were inaccurate.
- Figures do not include an estimated 20 million children not born because the war depressed fertility/birth rates.
- ADK pointed out that the beginning population in 1941 and the ending population at 1 January 1946 are rough estimates since figures for the territories annexed in 1939–1940 and emigration from the USSR during the war are based on fragmentary information.

Total War Deaths by Age Group and Gender
| Age Group | Mid 1941–Males (millions) | 1941–45 Male War Deaths (millions) | % Age Group | Mid 1941–Females (millions) | 1941–45 Female War Deaths (millions) | % Age Group | Mid 1941–Total Population (millions) | 1941–45 Total War Deaths (millions) | % Age Group | Excess Male Deaths (Millions) |
|---|---|---|---|---|---|---|---|---|---|---|
| 0–14 | 27.879 | 1.425 | 5.1% | 27.984 | 1.398 | 5.0% | 55.863 | 2.823 | 5.1% | .027 |
| 15–19 | 11.092 | 1.064 | 9.6% | 11.220 | 0.340 | 3.0% | 22.312 | 1.404 | 6.3% | .723 |
| 20–34 | 24.948 | 9.005 | 36.1% | 26.330 | 2.663 | 10.1% | 51.278 | 11.668 | 22.8% | 6.342 |
| 35–49 | 18.497 | 6.139 | 33.2% | 20.236 | 0.781 | 3.9% | 38.733 | 6.920 | 17.9% | 5.358 |
| Over 49 | 11.999 | 2.418 | 20.2% | 16.976 | 1.380 | 8.1% | 28.975 | 3.798 | 13.1% | 1.038 |
| All Age Groups | 94.415 | 20.051 | 21.2% | 102.746 | 6.562 | 6.4% | 197.161 | 26.613 | 13.5% | 13.489 |

Remarks:

- 0–14–The deaths of 2.8 million children was due primarily to famine and disease caused by the war.
- 15–19–The excess deaths of 724,000 males compared to females was due primarily to military losses. The wartime draft age was 18.
- 20–34–The excess deaths of 6,342,000 males compared to females was due primarily to military losses. The deaths of 2,663,000 women is an indication that they were involved in the partisan war and became victims of Nazi reprisals.
- 35–49–The excess deaths of 5,358,000 males compared to females was due primarily to military losses.
- Over 49–The excess deaths of 1,038,000 males compared to females was due primarily to military losses. Some served in the Armed Forces. Others were involved in the partisan war and became victims of Nazi reprisals.
- All Ages–The excess deaths of 13,489,000 males compared to females was due primarily to military losses with regular forces as well partisan forces. The figures are a clear indication that many Soviet civilians died in the war from reprisals, famine and disease.

==== Voter lists in the 1946 election ====
Another study, The Demographic History of Russia 1927–1959, analyzed voters in the February 1946 election to estimate the surviving population over the age of 18 at the end of the war. The population under 18 was estimated based on the 1959 census. Official records listed 101.7 million registered voters and 94.0 million actual voters, 7.7 million less than the expected figure. ADK maintained that the official results of the 1946 election are not a good source for estimating the population. They believe that the total of expected voters should be increased by 10.5 million because the roll of voters excluded those deprived of their rights, in prison or in exile. ADK maintained that many young military men did not participate in the election, and an overestimation of women in rural areas without internal passports who sought to avoid compulsory heavy labor. Included in the voter total were 29.9 million "excess" women. However number of expected voters estimated by ADK the gap between males and females was 21.4 million, which approximates the 20.7 million gap revealed by the 1959 census. The prewar population of 1939 (including the annexed territories) had an excess of 7.9 million females. The ADK analysis found that the gap had increased by about 13.5 million.

==== Alternative sources of demographic losses ====
Russian demographer Rybakovsky found a wide range of estimates for total war dead. He estimated the actual population in 1941 at 196.7 million and losses at 27–28 million. He cited figures that range from 21.7 to 46 million. Rybakovsky acknowledged that the components used to compute losses are uncertain and disputed.

Population estimates for mid-1941 range from 191.8 to 200.1 million, while the population at the end of 1945 range from 167.0 million up to 170.6 million. Based on the pre-war birth rate, the population shortfall was about 20 million births in 1946. Some were born and died during the war, while the balance was never born. Only rough estimates are available for each group. Estimates for the population of the territories annexed from 1939 to 1945 range from 17 to 23 million persons.

Rybakovsky provided a list of the various estimates of Soviet war losses by Russian scholars since 1988.

Casualty estimates
| Analyst | Deaths (in millions) |
|---|---|
| A. Kvasha (1988) | 26–27 |
| A. Samsonov (1988) | 26–27 |
| Yu. Polyakov (1989) | 26–27 |
| L. L. Rybakovsky (1989) | 27–28 |
| I. Kurganov (1990) | 44 |
| S. Ivanov (1990) | 46 |
| E. M. Andreev (1990) | 26.6 (Note: Accepted by Russian government) |
| A. Samsonov (1991) | 26–27 |
| A. Shevyakov (1991) | 27.7 |
| A. Shevyakov (1992) | 29.5 |
| V. Eliseev, S. Mikhalev (1992) | 21.8 |
| A. Sokolov (1995) | 21.7–23.7 |
| Boris Sokolov (1998) | 43.3 |

=== Estimates of losses by individual republics ===
The contemporary nations that were formerly Soviet Republics dispute Krivosheev's analysis. In a live broadcast of 16 December 2010, A Conversation with Vladimir Putin, he maintained that the Russian Federation had suffered the greatest proportional losses in World War II—70 percent of the total. Official estimates by the former republics of the USSR claim military casualties exceeding those of Krivosheev's report by 3.5 times. It is claimed by the website sovsekretno.ru that there are no Memory Books published in the USSR, Russia and the other contemporary republics in the 80s and 90s listing casualties of 25 percent of the draft or less, but there are many Memory Books with 50 per cent and more with some telling us of a 70, 75, 76 and up to 79 per cent mortality rate among the conscripted.

- The Ukrainian authorities and historians ardently dispute these figures. Military casualties alone may be estimated as exceeding 7 million, according to the final volume of the Ukrainian book "In the memory of posterity" and research of V. E. Korol, writes an American (former Soviet) Doctor of History Vilen Lyulechnik. Former President of Ukraine Viktor Yanukovych maintains that Ukraine has lost more than 10 million lives during the Second World War.
- According to Belarusian military historian Vladimir Lemeshonok, Belarusian military casualties exceed 682,000, including over 600,000 frontline soldiers, as well as 44,791 partisans and 37,500 underground fighters.
- The Memory Book of Tatarstan Government contains names of about 350,000 inhabitants of the republic, mostly Tatars.
- Israeli historian Yitzhak Arad maintains that about 200,000 Soviet Jews or 40 per cent of all draft were killed in battles or captivity — the highest percentage of all nations of the USSR.
- Kazakhstan estimates its military casualties at 601,029.
- Armenians estimate their military casualties at over 300,000.
- Georgians also estimate their military casualties at over 300,000.
- Among the others, Azerbaijanis claim military casualties of 300,000, Bashkirs of about 300,000, Mordvas of 130,000 and Chuvashes of 106,470. But one of the most tragic figures comes from the Far Eastern republic of Yakutia and its small nation. 37,965 citizens, mostly Yakuts, or 60.74 per cent of 62,509 drafted did not return home with 7,000 regarded missing. About 69,000 died of severe famine in the republic. This nation could not restore its population even under 1959 census. The record breaking estimates of 700,000 military casualties out of a total 1,25 million Turkmenian citizens (with slightly less than 60 per cent being Turkmens) are attributed to the late President of Turkmenistan Saparmurat Niyazov. Historians do not regard them as being trustworthy.

=== Estimated losses by Soviet republic ===
Russian historian Vadim Erlikman pegs total war deaths at 10.7 million, exceeding Krivosheev's 8.7 million by an extra two million. This extra two million would presumably include Soviet POWs that died in Nazi captivity, partisans, and militia.

Deaths by Soviet republic
| Soviet Republic | Population 1940 | Military Dead | Civilian Dead | Total | Deaths as % 1940 Pop. |
|---|---|---|---|---|---|
| Armenian SSR | 1,320,000 | 150,000 | 30,000 | 180,000 | 13.6% |
| Azerbaijan SSR | 3,270,000 | 210,000 | 90,000 | 300,000 | 9.1% |
| Byelorussian SSR | 9,050,000 | 620,000 | 1,670,000 | 2,290,000 | 25.3% |
| Estonian SSR | 1,050,000 | 30,000 | 50,000 | 80,000 | 7.6% |
| Georgian SSR | 3,610,000 | 190,000 | 110,000 | 300,000 | 8.3% |
| Kazakh SSR | 6,150,000 | 310,000 | 350,000 | 660,000 | 10.7% |
| Kirghiz SSR | 1,530,000 | 70,000 | 50,000 | 120,000 | 7.8% |
| Latvian SSR | 1,890,000 | 30,000 | 230,000 | 260,000 | 13.7% |
| Lithuanian SSR | 2,930,000 | 25,000 | 350,000 | 375,000 | 12.8% |
| Moldavian SSR | 2,470,000 | 50,000 | 120,000 | 170,000 | 6.9% |
| Russian SFSR | 110,100,000 | 6,750,000 | 7,200,000 | 13,950,000 | 12.7% (A) |
| Tajik SSR | 1,530,000 | 50,000 | 70,000 | 120,000 | 7.8% |
| Turkmen SSR | 1,300,000 | 70,000 | 30,000 | 100,000 | 7.7% |
| Uzbek SSR | 6,550,000 | 330,000 | 220,000 | 550,000 | 8.4% |
| Ukrainian SSR | 41,340,000 | 1,650,000 | 5,200,000 | 6,850,000 | 16.3% (B) |
| Unidentified | - | 165,000 | 130,000 | 295,000 | |
| Total USSR | 194,090,000 | 10,700,000 | 15,900,000 | 26,600,000 | 13.7% |

- The source of the figures on the table is Vadim Erlikman. Poteri narodonaseleniia v XX veke : spravochnik. Moscow 2004. ISBN 5-93165-107-1 pp. 23–35 Erlikman notes that these figures are his estimates. This table includes civilian losses in Transcaucasian and Central Asian republics due to famine and disease caused by wartime shortfalls estimated by Vadim Erlikman.

=== Memorial archive ===
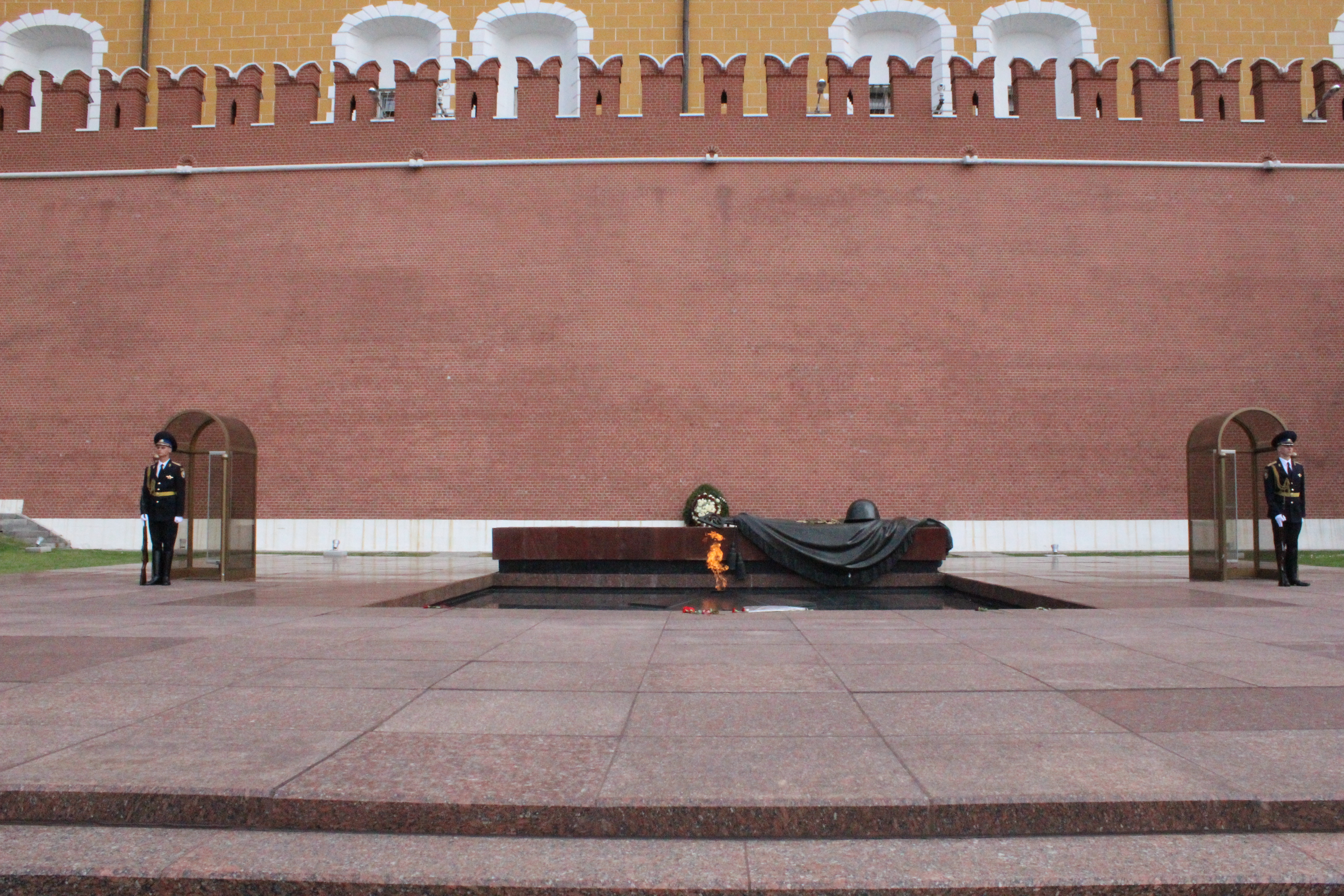
Tomb of the unknown soldier in Moscow

The names of Soviet war dead are presented at the Memorial database online.

== Causes ==
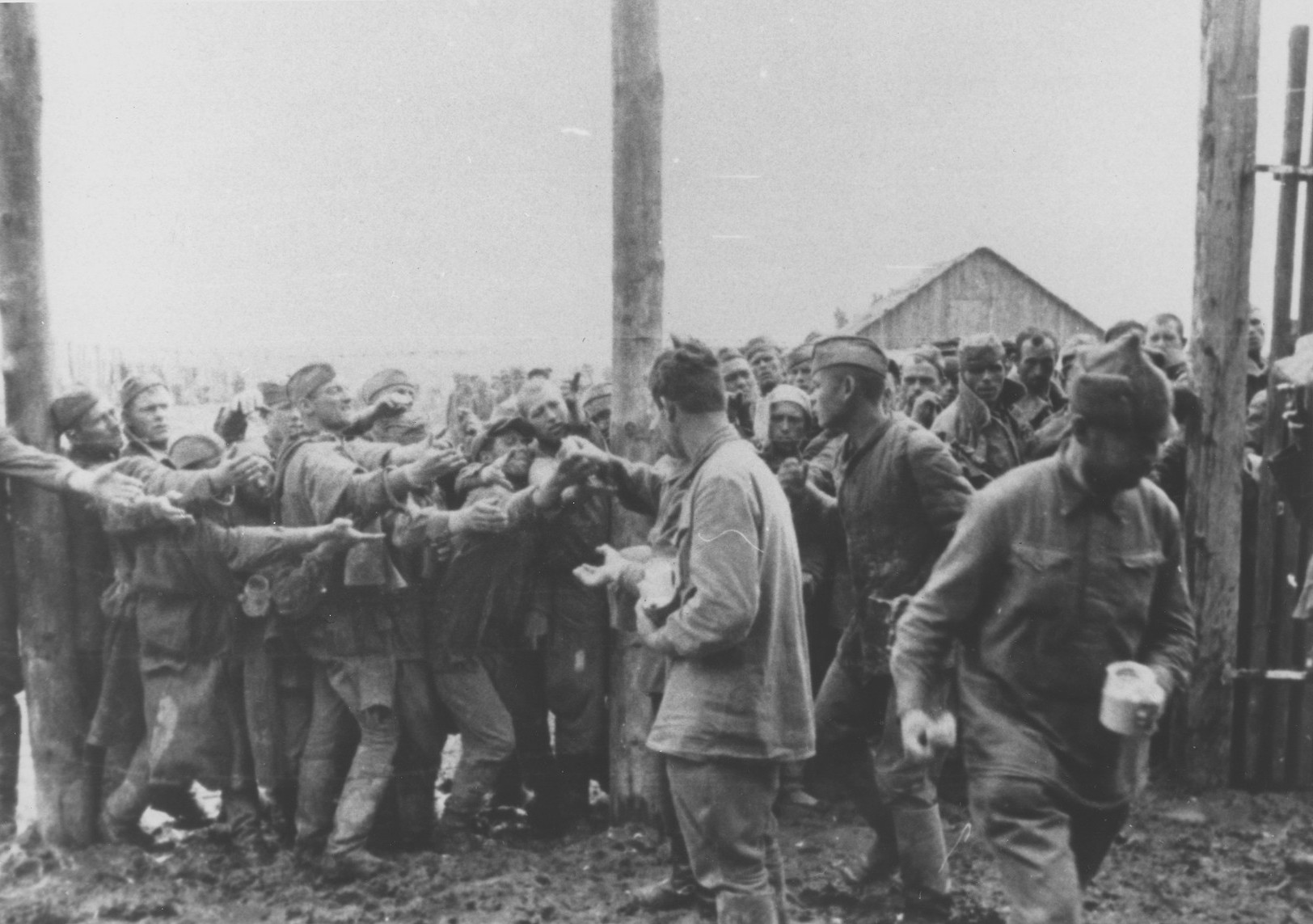
Soviet prisoners of war held in German camp

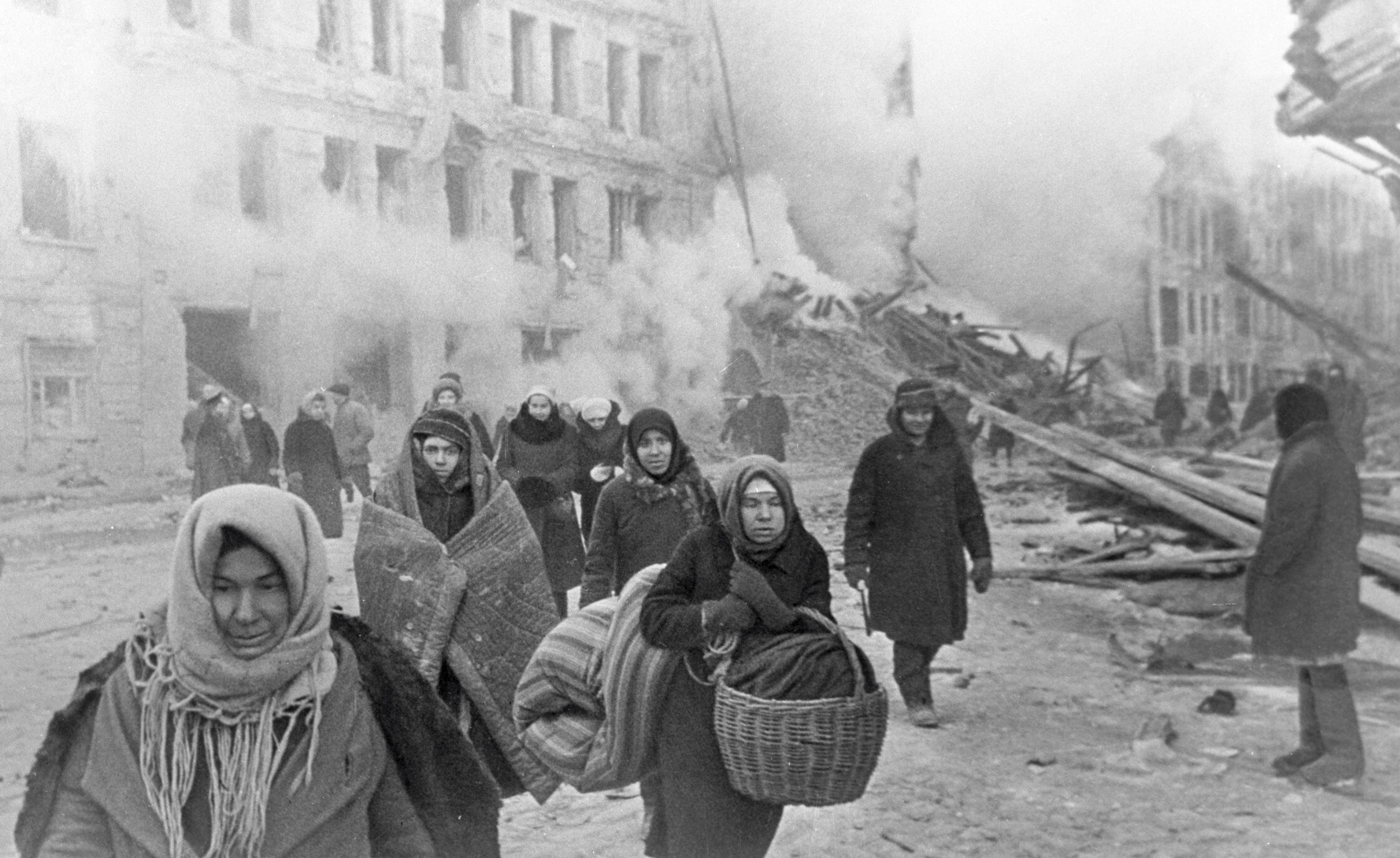
Citizens of Leningrad leaving their houses destroyed by German bombing

The Red Army suffered catastrophic losses of men and equipment during the first months of the German invasion. In the spring of 1941 Stalin ignored the warnings of his intelligence services of a planned German invasion and refused to put the Armed forces on alert. The bulk of the Soviet combat units were deployed in the border regions in a lower state of readiness. In the face of the German onslaught the Soviet forces were caught by surprise. Large numbers of Soviet soldiers were captured and many perished due to the brutal mistreatment of POWs by the Nazis. Earl F. Ziemke maintained high Soviet losses can be attributed to 'less efficient medical services and the Soviet tactics, which throughout the war tended to be expensive in terms of human life"

Russian scholars attribute the high civilian death toll to the Nazi Generalplan Ost which treated Soviet peoples as "subhumans", they use the terms "genocide" and "premeditated extermination" when referring to civilian losses in the occupied USSR. German occupation policies implemented under the Hunger Plan resulted in the confiscation of food stocks which resulted in famine in the occupied regions. During the Soviet era the partisan campaign behind the lines was portrayed as the struggle of the local population against the German occupation. To suppress the partisan units the Nazi occupation forces engaged in a campaign of brutal reprisals against innocent civilians. The extensive fighting destroyed agricultural land, infrastructure, and whole towns, leaving much of the population homeless and without food. During the war Soviet civilians were taken to Germany as forced laborers under inhumane conditions.

== Summary of the estimates and their sources ==
Estimates for Soviet losses in the Second World War range from 7 million to over 43 million. During the Communist era in the Soviet Union historical writing about World War II was subject to censorship and only official approved statistical data was published. In the USSR during the Glasnost period under Gorbachev and in post communist Russia the casualties in World War II were re-evaluated and the official figures revised.

=== 1946 to 1987 ===
Joseph Stalin in March 1946 stated that Soviet war losses were 7 million dead. This was to be the official figure until the Khrushchev era. In November 1961 Nikita Khrushchev stated that Soviet war losses were 20 million; this was to be the official figure until the Gorbachev era of Glasnost. (Note: The Russian researcher L L Rybakovsky assumes that the source of Nikita Khrushchev's figure of 20 million war dead was the 1957 Soviet translation,(Itogi vtoroj mirovoj vojny. Sbornik statej) of the West German book Bilanz des Zweiten Weltkrieges Hamburg 1953.) Leonid Brezhnev in 1965 put the Soviet death toll in the war at "more than 20 million" Ivan Konev in a May 1965 Soviet Ministry of Defense press conference stated that Soviet military dead in World War II were 10 million. In 1971, the Soviet demographer Boris Urlanis put losses at 20 million including 6,074,000 civilians and 3,912,000 prisoners of war killed by Nazi Germany, military dead were put at 10 million.

Documents from the Extraordinary State Commission prepared in March 1946 not but published until the 1990s listed 6,074,857 civilians killed, 3,912,283 prisoner of war dead, 3,999,796 deaths during German forced labor and 641,803 civilian famine deaths during Siege of Leningrad. The Soviet general staff put losses at 8,668,000 dead and missing, however the General Staffs figures were not published until 1993. Also 688,772 Soviet citizens who remained in western countries after the war were included with the war losses.

=== 1988 to 1992 ===
During the period of Glasnost, the official figure of 20 million war dead was challenged by Soviet scholars. In 1988–1989, estimates of 26 to 28 million total war dead appeared in the Soviet press. The Russian scholar Dmitri Volkogonov, writing at this, time estimated total war deaths at 26–27,000,000, including 10,000,000 in the military. In March 1989, Mikhail Gorbachev established a committee to investigate Soviet war losses. In a May 1990 speech, Gorbachev gave the figure for total Soviet losses at "almost 27 million". This revised figure was the result of research by the committee set up by Gorbachev that estimated total war dead at between 26 and 27 million. In January 1990, M.A. Moiseev, Chief of the General Staff of the Soviet Armed Forces, disclosed for the first time in an interview that Soviet military war dead totaled 8,668,400. In 1991, the Russian scholar A.A. Shevyakov published an article with summary of civilian losses based on his analysis of the archival records of the Soviet Extraordinary State Commission, civilian dead were given as 17.7 million. (Note: 6.390 million exterminated; 2.8 million forced labor; 8.5 million famine and disease голода и эпидемий in occupied regions) In a second article in 1992, A.A. Shevyakov gave a figure of 20.8 million civilian dead; (Note: 11.3 million exterminated; 3.0 forced labor; 6.5 million famine and disease голода и эпидемий in occupied regions) no explanation for the difference was given.

=== Russian estimates published in the West from 1950 to 1983 ===
In 1949, Colonel Kalinov defected to the Western Bloc, where he published a book claiming that Soviet records indicated the military loss of 13.6 million men, including 2.6 million POW dead. Sergei Maksudov, a Russian demographer living in the West, estimated Soviet war losses at between 24.5 and 27.4 million, including 7.5 million military dead. The Soviet mathematician Iosif G. Dyadkin published a study in the United States that estimated the total Soviet population losses from 1939 to 1945, due to the war and political repression, at 30 million. Dyadkin was imprisoned for publishing this study in the West.

=== Western scholars ===
Historians writing outside of the Soviet Union and Russia have evaluated the various Russian language sources and have offered their estimates of Soviet war dead. Here is a listing of estimates by recognized scholars published in the West.

| Source | Military Dead | Civilian Dead | Total Dead |
|---|---|---|---|
| Frank Lorimer (1946), (Note: Lorimer's hypothetical figures, not an estimate, for territory in the 1939 borders put the total demographic loss at 20.0 million. 9.0 million civilians killed over age 5 and a deficit of 6.0 million children under age 5 not born during the war or died during the war. The figure of 5.0 million military dead was based on information available in 1945 which was published in the USSR during the war. In addition losses in the annexed territories were put at 2,000,000) | 5,000,000 | 11,000,000 | 16,000,000 (within 1940 borders) |
| Pierre George (1946) | 7,000,000 | 10,000,000 | 17,000,000 |
| N. S. Timasheff (1948), | 7,000,000 | 18,300,000 | 25,300,000 |
| Helmut Arntz (1953) | 13,600,000 | 7,000,000 | 20,000,000+ |
| Jean-Noël Biraben (1958) | 8,000,000 | 6,700,000 | 14,700,000 |
| Warren W. Eason (1959) | 10,000,000 | 15,000,000 | 25,000,000 |
| E. Ziemke (1968) | more than 12,000,000 | | |
| Albert Seaton (1971) | 10,000,000 | | |
| Gil Elliot (1972) | 10,000,000 | 10,000,000 | 20,000,000 |
| Charles Messenger (1989) | | | 20,000,000 |
| John Keegan (1989) | 7,000,000 | 7,000,000 | 14,000,000 |
| R. J. Rummel (1990) | 7,000,000 | 12,250,000 | 19,625,000 plus 10,000,000 due to Soviet repression |
| John Ellis (1993) | 11,000,000 | 6,700,000 | 17,700,000 |
| Michael Ellman and Sergei Maksudov (1994) | 8,700,000 | 18,000,000 | 26–27,000,000 |
| Norman Davies (1996) | 8–9,000,000 | 16–19,000,000 | 24–28,000,000 |
| Richard Overy (1997) | 8,668,400 | 17,000,000 | 25,000,000 |
| Mark Mazower (1998) | 9,500,000 | 10,000,000 | 19,500,000 |
| David Wallechinsky (1995) | 13,600,000 | | 20–26,000,000 |
| Micheal Clodfelter (2002) | 8,668,400 | | 20–26,000,000 |
| Michael Haynes (2003) | 8,700,000 | 17,900,000 | 26,600,000 |
| Martin Gilbert (2004) | 10,000,000; KIA & 3,300,000; POW | 7,000,000 | 20,000,000+ |
| H. P. Willmott (2004) | 8,700,000 | 16,900,000 | 25,600,000 |
| Tony Judt (2005) | 8,600,000 | 16,000,000 | 24,600,000 |
| Norman Davies (2006) | 8,668,000 | 18,332,000 | 27,000,000 |
| Cambridge History of Russia (2006) | 8,700,000+ | 13,700,000 in Nazi occupied USSR and 2,600,000 in interior USSR | 24–26,000,000 |
| Steven Rosefielde (2010) | 8,700,000 "all causes" | "17,700,000 or 20,300,000" | "26,400,000 to 29,000,000" plus 5,458,000 due to Soviet repression |

- David Glantz maintains that "the war with Nazi Germany cost the Soviet Union at least 29 million military casualties" (dead, wounded and sick) "The exact numbers can never be established, and some revisionists have attempted to put the number as high as 50 million"
- Richard Overy believes the "figures for military dead published in 1993... give the fullest account yet available, but they omit three operations that were clear failures. The official figures themselves must be viewed critically, given the difficulty of knowing in the chaos of 1941 and 1942 exactly who had been killed, wounded or even conscripted" Regarding military dead Richard Overy believes that "for the present the figure of 8.6 million must be regarded as the most reliable"
- The authors of the Cambridge History of Russia have provided an analysis of Soviet wartime casualties. Overall losses were about 25 million persons plus or minus 1 million. Red Army records indicate 8.7 million military deaths, "this figure is actually the lower limit". The official figures understate POW losses and armed partisan deaths. Excess civilian deaths in the Nazi occupied USSR were 13.7 million persons including 2 million Jews. There were an additional 2.6 million deaths in the interior regions of the Soviet Union. The authors maintain "scope for error in this number is very wide". At least 1 million perished in the wartime GULAG camps or in deportations. Other deaths occurred in the wartime evacuations and due to war related malnutrition and disease in the interior. The authors maintain that both Stalin and Hitler "were both responsible but in different ways" for these deaths.
  The authors of the Cambridge History of Russia believe that "In short the general picture of Soviet wartime losses suggests a jigsaw puzzle. The general outline is clear: people died in colossal numbers but in many different miserable and terrible circumstances. But individual pieces of the puzzle do not fit well; some overlap and others are yet to be found"
- Steven Rosefielde puts the war related demographic losses of the USSR from 1941 to 1945 at 22.0 to 26.0 million persons (7.8 million military and 14.2 to 18.2 million civilians). The actual wartime losses are higher because some persons who would have died peacefully actually perished as a result of the war. Rosefielde estimated the actual military dead at 8.7 million men and 17.7 to 20.3 million civilians killed by the Nazis in the war (exterminated, shot, gassed burned 6.4 or 11.3 million; famine and disease 8.5 or 6.5 million; forced laborer in Germany 2.8 or 3.0 million and 500,000 who did not return to USSR after war.) In addition to these war deaths Rosefielde also estimated the excess deaths attributed to the "total potential crimes against humanity" due to Soviet repression at 2.183 million persons in 1939–40 and 5.458 million from 1941 to 1945. The figures for losses due to Soviet repression do not include 1 million military deaths of men drafted from the Gulag into penal suicide battalions.
- According to historian Timothy Snyder "More inhabitants of Soviet Ukraine died in the Second World War than inhabitants of Soviet Russia as calculated by Russian historians." These remarks were presented at the conference "Germany's Historical Responsibility towards Ukraine" ("Deutschen Historischen Verantwortung für die Ukraine"), German Bundestag, Berlin, Germany, 20 June 2017.

== See also ==
- German atrocities committed against Soviet prisoners of war
- Historiography in the Soviet Union
- The Holocaust in Russia
- The Holocaust in the Soviet Union
- War crimes in World War II
- World War II casualties
- World War II evacuation and expulsion
- List of Soviet military units that lost their standards in World War II

== Sources ==
- Krivosheev, G. F. (1993). "Soviet Armed Forces Losses in Wars, Combat Operations and Military Conflicts: A Statistical Study" (PDF). Translated by U.S. government. Moscow: Military Publishing House – via The Black Vault.
- Krivosheev, G. F. (1997). Soviet Casualties and Combat Losses in the Twentieth Century. Greenhill Books. ISBN 978-1-85367-280-4.
- Haynes, Michael (2003). "Counting Soviet Deaths in the Great Patriotic War: a Note". Europe-Asia Studies. 55 (2): 303–309. doi:10.1080/0966813032000055895. S2CID 154869793.
- Ellman, Michael; Maksudov, S. (July 1994). "Soviet Deaths in the Great Patriotic War:a note-World War II" (PDF). Europe-Asia Studies. 46 (4): 671–80. doi:10.1080/09668139408412190. PMID 12288331.
- Andreev, E. M.; Darski, L.E.; Kharkova, T.L. (11 September 2002). "Population dynamics: consequences of regular and irregular changes". In Lutz, Wolfgang; Scherbov, Sergei; Volkov, Andrei (eds.). Demographic Trends and Patterns in the Soviet Union Before 1991. Routledge. ISBN 978-1-134-85320-5.
- Il'Enkov, S. A. (June 1996). "Concerning the registration of Soviet armed forces' wartime irrevocable losses, 1941–1945". The Journal of Slavic Military Studies. 9 (2): 440–442. doi:10.1080/13518049608430243.
- Korol, V.E. (June 1996). "The Price of Victory: Myths and reality". Journal of Slavic Military Studies. 9 (2): 417–423. doi:10.1080/13518049608430240.
- Suny, Ronald Grigor, ed. (2 November 2006). The Cambridge History of Russia: Volume 3, The Twentieth Century. Cambridge University Press. ISBN 978-0-521-81144-6.
- Overy, Richard (29 July 1999). Russia's War. Penguin Books Limited. ISBN 978-0-14-192512-7.
- Rummel, Rudolph J. (1992). Democide: Nazi Genocide and Mass Murder. Transaction Publishers. ISBN 978-1-4128-2147-6.
- Seaton, Albert (1993). The Russo–German War, 1941–45. Random House Publishing Group. ISBN 978-0-89141-491-9.
- Urlanis, Boris (1971). Populations and Wars. Moscow: Progress.
- Urlanis, Boris (1 November 2003). Wars and Population. University Press of the Pacific. ISBN 978-1-4102-0945-0.
- Dyadkin, Iosif G. (1 January 1983). Unnatural Deaths in the USSR, 1928–1954. Transaction Publishers. ISBN 978-1-4128-4074-3.

(in Russian)

- Krivosheev, G. I. (2001). Rossiia i SSSR v voinakh XX veka: Poteri vooruzhennykh sil; statisticheskoe issledovanie. OLMA-Press. ISBN 5-224-01515-4.
- Krivosheev, G. I. (2010). Russia & USSR at War in the 20th century. Moscow: Veche. ISBN 978-5-953-33877-6.
- Mikhalev, S. N (2000). Liudskie poteri v Velikoi Otechestvennoi voine 1941–1945 gg: Statisticheskoe issledovanie (Human Losses in the Great Patriotic War 1941–1945 A Statistical Investigation) (in Russian). Krasnoiarskii gos. pedagog. universitet (Krasnoyarsk State Pedagogical University). ISBN 978-5-85981-082-6.
- Yevdokimov, Rostislav, ed. (1995). Людские потери СССР в период второй мировой войны: сборник статей [Human Losses of the USSR during the Second World War: a collection of articles]. Saint-Petersburg: Ин-т российской истории РАН (Russian Academy of Sciences). ISBN 978-5-86789-023-0.
  - Filimoshin, M. V. (14 March 1995). "Об итогах исчисления потерь среди мирного населения на оккупированной территории СССР и РСФСР б годы Великой Отечественной войны [On the Results of the Calculation of Civilian Casualties in the Occupied Territory of the USSR and the RSFSR during the Great Patriotic War]". In Yevdokimov, Rostislav (ed.). Людские потери СССР в период второй мировой войны: сборник статей [Human Losses of the USSR during the Second World War: a collection of articles] (conference proceedings). Rossija v cifrach i dokumentach [Russia in numbers and documents]. Saint-Petersburg: Изд-во Русско-Балтийский информационный центр "БЛИЦ" [Rus.-Balt. inform. center "Blic"]. pp. 124–131. ISBN 978-5-86789-023-0. OCLC 312279586.
- Sokolov, Boris (March 1996). "ЦЕНА ВОЙНЫ:ЛЮДСКИЕ ПОТЕРИ СССР И ГЕРМАНИИ, 1939–1945" [The cost of war: Human losses for the USSR and Germany, 1939–1945]. Journal of Slavic Military Studies (in Russian). 9 (1).
- Andreev, E. M.; Darski, L.E.; Kharkova, T.L. (1993). Naselenie Sovetskogo Soiuza, 1922–1991. Moscow: Nauka. ISBN 978-5-02-013479-9.
- Andreev, E. M.; Darski, L.E.; Kharkova, T.L. (1998). "Chapter 7". Demographic History of Russia 1927–1959 (in Russian). Archived from the original on 9 September 2013.
- Il'Enkov, S. A. (2001). Pamyat O Millionach Pavshik Zaschitnikov Otechestva Nelzya Predavat Zabveniu Voennno-Istoricheskii Arkhiv No. 7(22) The Memory of those who Fell Defending the Fatherland Cannot be Condemned to Oblivion (in Russian). Central Military Archives of the Russian Federation. pp. 73–80. ISBN 978-5-89710-005-7.
- Erlikhman, Vadim (2004). Потери народонаселения в 20. веке. Русская панорама. ISBN 978-5-93165-107-1.
- Lopukhovsky, Lev; Kavalerchik, Boris (21 December 2012). "Когда мы узнаем реальную цену разгрома гитлеровской Германии?". podelise.ru. Archived from the original on 4 March 2016.
- Rybakovsky, L. L. (2000). "Л.Л. РЫБАКОВСКИЙЛЮДСКИЕ ПОТЕРИ СССР В ВЕЛИКОЙ ОТЕЧЕСТВЕННОЙ ВОЙНЕ" [Casualties of the USSR in the Great Patriotic War] (PDF). Sotsiologicheskie issiedovaniya (in Russian). No. 6. (1st article)
- Rybakovsky, L. L. (2000a). "Л.Л. РЫБАКОВСКИЙЛЮДСКИЕ ПОТЕРИ СССР В ВЕЛИКОЙ ОТЕЧЕСТВЕННОЙ ВОЙНЕ" [Casualties of the USSR in the Great Patriotic War] (PDF). Sotsiologicheskie issiedovaniya (in Russian). No. 8. Archived from the original (PDF) on 21 July 2011. (2nd article)
- Rybakovsky, L. L. (2001). "The Great Patriotic War Russian Human Losses (In Russian)" (PDF). Sotsiologicheskie issiedovaniya. No. 6. Archived from the original (PDF) on 21 July 2011.
- Shevyakov, A. A. (1991). "Gitlerovski genotsid na territoriyakh SSR" (PDF). Sotsiologicheskie issiedovaniya. Archived from the original (PDF) on 21 July 2011. This article by a researcher at the Russian Academy of Science is a brief summary of the work of the Soviet Extraordinary State Commission.
- Shevyakov, A. A. (1992). "Zhertvy sredi mirnogo nasseleniya v gody otechestvennoi voiny" (PDF). Sotsiologicheskie issiedovaniya. Archived from the original (PDF) on 24 September 2011. This article by a researcher at the Russian Academy of Science gives a detailed breakdown by locality of civilian losses in the occupied USSR based on the reports of the Soviet Extraordinary State Commission.
