= Russian casualties of war =

List of Russian war

Russian casualties of war lists deaths of Russian armed forces and Russian citizens caused by conflicts in which Russia was involved. The Soviet wars listed below also include deaths of all Soviet armed forces and all Soviet citizens caused by conflicts in which the Soviet Union was involved.

Conflict	Start	End	Military dead	Military wounded	Civilian dead	Total dead	Note
World War II	1939	1945	8,668,400–11,400,000	15,685,593	12,500,000–19,000,000	21,168,400–30,400,000	Krivosheev, G. F
World War I	1914	1918	1,700,000–2,254,369	3,749,000	1,140,000	2,840,000–3,394,369	Russia and the USSR in the Wars of the 20th Century
Russo-Ukrainian War	2014	Present	358,500–663,384 (285,881 confirmed by names)	900,000-1,000,000+		285,881–663,384	Mediazona, September 2026
Crimean War	1853	1856	450,015–630,000			450,015–630,000	Clodfelter, Kozelsky
Napoleonic Wars	1803	1815	210,000	150,000	240,000–290,000	450,000–500,000	
Seven Years' War	1756	1763	120,000			120,000	
Russo-Japanese War	1904	1905	43,300–71,453	146,032		43,300–71,453	
Polish–Soviet War	1918	1919	60,000	102,000		60,000	Rummel p 55
Soviet–Afghan War	1979	1988	14,500–26,000	53,753		14,500–26,000	Casualties of the War in Afghanistan
First Chechen War	1994	1996	5,552–14,000	52,000		14,000	Casualty Figures, Jamestown Foundation – first Chechen War
Soviet–Japanese War	7 August 1945	2 September 1945	9,780	19,562		9,780	When Titans Clashed: How the Red Army Stopped Hitler
Second Chechen War	1999	2009	6,029–11,000			6,029	"Defense and Security / PressPATROL
Soviet invasion of Poland	17 September 1939	6 October 1939	3,000	20,000		3,000	Sanford pp. 20–24 Sanford, George
Russo-Georgian War	7 August 2008	12 August 2008	162	283	65	227	"The Tanks of August"

Table by month of the official estimates of "Casualties of the Russian troops in Ukraine" numbers (from the General Staff of the AFU)
Month and year	Cumulative	Monthly net
February 2022	5,300	5,300
March 2022	17,500	12,200
April 2022	23,200	5,700
May 2022	30,500	7,300
June 2022	35,600	5,100
July 2022	40,830	5,230
August 2022	47,900	7,070
September 2022	59,080	11,180
October 2022	71,820	12,740
November 2022	88,880	17,060
December 2022	105,960	17,080
January 2023	127,500	21,540
February 2023	149,240	21,740
March 2023	173,360	24,120
April 2023	190,510	17,150
May 2023	207,910	17,400
June 2023	228,340	20,430
July 2023	246,190	17,850
August 2023	263,020	16,830
September 2023	278,130	15,110
October 2023	300,810	22,680
November 2023	328,760	27,950
December 2023	359,230	30,470
January 2024	385,230	26,000
February 2024	413,760	28,530
March 2024	442,170	28,410
April 2024	468,720	26,550
May 2024	507,650	38,930
June 2024	542,700	35,050
July 2024	578,120	35,420
August 2024	614,950	36,830
September 2024	653,060	38,110
October 2024	694,950	41,890
November 2024	740,400	45,450
December 2024	789,550	49,150
January 2025	837,610	48,060
February 2025	874,560	36,950
March 2025	915,230	40,670
April 2025	951,960	36,730
May 2025	987,330	35,370
June 2025	1,020,010	32,680
July 2025	1,053,260	33,250
August 2025	1,082,140	28,880
September 2025	1,110,560	28,420
October 2025	1,141,830	31,270
November 2025	1,172,860	31,030
December 2025	1,207,910	35,050
January 2026	1,239,590	31,680
February 2026	1,265,900	26,310
March 2026	1,297,670	31,770
April 2026	1,330,290	32,620
May 2026	1,364,060	33,770
June 2026	1,403,550	39,490
July 2026	1,446,150	42,600
August 2026	1,488,200	42,050
September 2026	1,534,430	46,230
October 2026	1,588,170	53,740

The Russian military's attrition rates in Ukraine are worse than WW1. The November 2023 monthly Russian troop casualties doubled the number from March 2022. Russia's ability to adjust its recruitment rates to match ongoing personnel losses remains a central factor in its long-term force sustainability.
