= The Soviet Story =

2008 documentary film

- Directed by: Edvīns Šnore
- Written by: Edvīns Šnore
- Produced by: Kristaps Valdnieks
- Narrated by: Jon Strickland
- Cinematography: Edgars Daugavvanags; Uvis Brujāns
- Edited by: Nic Gotham
- Release date: May 5, 2008
- Running time: 85 minutes
- Country: Latvia
- Languages: English and Russian

The Soviet Story is a 2008 documentary film about the Soviet Union and Soviet–German relations before 1941 and after, written and directed by Edvīns Šnore, and sponsored by the Union for Europe of the Nations group in the European Parliament. The film features interviews with Western and Russian historians such as Norman Davies and Boris Vadimovich Sokolov, the Russian writer Viktor Suvorov, the Soviet dissident Vladimir Bukovsky, members of the European Parliament, and participants and survivors of the Soviet terror.

Using those interviews, together with historical footage and documents, the film documentary argues that there were close philosophical, political and organisational connections between the Nazi and the Soviet systems. It highlights the Lenin's hanging order, the Great Purge, the Holodomor, the mass graves in the Soviet Union, the Molotov–Ribbentrop Pact, the Katyn massacre, the Gestapo–NKVD collaboration, the German-Soviet military parade, the German–Soviet Axis talks, the NKVD prisoner massacres, forced population transfer in the Soviet Union, and the medical experiments in the gulags. The documentary goes on to argue that the successor states to Nazi Germany and the Soviet Union differ in the sense that postwar Germany condemns the actions of Nazi Germany, but the opinion in contemporary Russia is summarised by a quote from Vladimir Putin: "One needs to acknowledge that the collapse of the Soviet Union was the greatest geopolitical catastrophe of the century." In the closing credits of the film, it is stated: "The Soviet Union killed more than 20,000,000 men, women and children. This film is dedicated to them."

== Analysis and memory ==
The documentary film, commissioned by the national-conservative and right-wing Union for Europe of the Nations group in the European Parliament, compared the atrocities of the two regimes. In the documentary, producer and director Edvīns Šnore argued that "not only were the crimes of the former inspired by the crimes of the latter, but that they helped each other, and that without their mutual assistance the outcome of World War II could have been quite different." In Latvia the forced Soviet deportations are commonly seen as a genocidal practice. The European Day of Remembrance for Victims of Stalinism and Nazism, proclaimed by the European Parliament in August 2008 and endorsed by the Organization for Security and Co-operation in Europe in July 2009; it is officially known as the Black Ribbon Day in some countries, including Canada. Some scholars in Western Europe have rejected the comparison of the two totalitarian regimes and the equation of their crimes.

According to Mārtiņš Kaprāns, a communication science expert and researcher at the Institute of Philosophy and Sociology, University of Latvia, "[s]cholars have argued that The Soviet Story is an effective Latvian response to Russian propaganda, but it also exemplifies the broader problems of post-communist memory politics." Kaprāns writes that "the idea of how memory work triggered by the documentary got started on social networking sites" and on "the video-sharing website YouTube and the Internet encyclopedia Wikipedia, both of which are crucial meaning-making sites with respect to history." According to Kaprāns, his memory studies article "demonstrates transnational memory work in YouTube and Wikipedia as a multidirectional enterprise that both reinforces and emancipates existing hegemonic representations of controversial past."

This film had also been aired on several televisions with 12+ or 18+ rating, including TVR, TVP and TVB.

== Reactions ==
=== Positive ===
Various Members of the European Parliament (MEPs) who were interviewed for the film have expressed views in favour of it. According to the Latvian MEPs Inese Vaidere and Ģirts Valdis Kristovskis, writing in The Parliament Magazine, "The Soviet Story makes a significant contribution to the establishment of a common understanding of history and brings us closer to the truth about the tragic events of the 20th century. A common understanding of history among the member states is crucial for the future of the whole EU." Both Vaidere and Kristovskis represent the Union for Europe of the Nations group which actively supported the production of the film.

After watching the film, Finnish MEP Ari Vatanen opined: "It is a powerful message. Thank you for telling the truth. It will awaken people." After the premiere in the European parliament, Vatanen stated: "We cannot build a humanity if we close our eyes to this kind of massacres. Our possibility is to serve justice to those people." British MEP Christopher Beazley commented: "This film is very important. It's a very powerful representation of what took place in Poland, in Latvia and the other Central European countries."

Vytautas Landsbergis, MEP and the former head of the Seimas, assessed The Soviet Story as "a world class film, which should be shown to the world", while Latvia's Minister of Justice Gaidis Bērziņš from For Fatherland and Freedom/LNNK stated that he would encourage the Ministry of Education to have the film shown in all schools in Latvia because of its important historical message.

=== Negative ===
A number of critics condemned the film even before its premiere. Boris Tsilevitch, a Latvian member of the Saeima representing Harmony Centre, stated that it was a "typical propaganda" and its release was timed to coincide with the 2009 European Parliament election in Latvia. MEP from Latvia Tatjana Ždanoka, who opposed Latvia's independence from the Soviet Union and ran as a candidate of the largest Russian political bloc in Latvia, regards the film as a "propagandistic odd job, which is given out to be "a new word in history", while also expressing her belief that "the second part of the film is pure political PR" because the first part of the film pictures the point of view of some historians and contemporary politicians criticize modern Russia in the end of the film. Ždanoka also stated that "a lot of attention was devoted to the partnership of the German and Russian military. This is followed by a jump forward in time to the 1940s, with a mass-meeting of Vlasovites is shown against a background of swastika."

The film prompted negative reactions from Russian organizations, press, and politicians. The film was strongly boycotted by Russia. According to the "European Voice" newspaper, Russians are infuriated by the film which reveals the extent of Nazi and Soviet collaboration. On 17 May 2008, the Russian pro-governmental youth organization Young Russia (Russian: Россия Молодая) organized the protest "Let's not allow the rewriting of history!" (Russian: Не дадим переписать историю!, romanized: Ne dadim perepisat' istoriyu!) in front of the Embassy of Latvia in Moscow; pro-Kremlin Russian protesters burned the effigy of Edvīns Šnore. Alexander Reshideovich Dyukov, a former member of the Russian ARMS-TASS Agency of Military and Technical Information, has been the most vocal critic of the documentary. He was quoted as saying: "After watching two thirds of the film, I had only one wish: to kill its director and to burn down the Latvian Embassy." As a result of Dyukov's statements, a criminal investigation was initiated against him in Latvia. Asked to comment on the case, Latvian Foreign Minister Māris Riekstiņš commented that Dyukov might be a "mentally unstable personality", while Prime Minister of Estonia Mart Laar called Dyukov "an officer of FSB", Russia's principal security agency.

Russian State Duma Deputy Irina Yarovaya, the coordinator of the ruling party United Russia's State Patriotic Club and a member of the Presidium of the General Council, declared that the film "glorifies Estonian Nazi collaborators, those who killed people in Khatyn and in Pskov region." In response to Yarovaya's statement, Estonian politician and historian Mart Laar wrote: "It is indeed impressive how much wrong can be put into one sentence. First, Estonians did not kill anyone in Khatyn and, secondly, the specific crime committed in Khatyn is not mentioned in the film at all. ... This gives the impression that Yarovaya, actually, has not seen the film."

== Reception ==
A Soviet officer salutes Nazi German SS officers while delivering Jewish prisoners to them in 1940 (screenshot from the film)

The film has attracted both praise and criticism from political commentators. The Economist praised it as "a sharply provocative work", and stated that "Soviet Story is the most powerful antidote yet to the sanitisation of the past. The film is gripping, audacious and uncompromising. ... The main aim of the film is to show the close connections—philosophical, political and organisational—between the Nazi and Soviet systems." For The New York Times, Neil Genzlinger wrote: "The filmmaking in The Soviet Story is so overwrought that at times the movie comes across as comical. ... The film is not dispassionate scholarship; Mr. Snore, who is Latvian, and his backers (including some members of the European Parliament) obviously have an agenda, though to the casual American viewer it may not be clear what it is."

Latvian political scientist and cultural commentator Ivars Ijabs offered a negative review of The Soviet Story, describing it as a well-made and "effective piece of cinematic propaganda in the good sense of this word", whose message is clearly presented to the audience. Ijabs does not agree with a number of historical interpretations in the film, asserting that it contains errors. In one example, Ijabs states: "In late 1930s Hitler did not yet plan a systematic genocide against the Jews [as it is suggested in the film]. Everybody knows that this decision was made in 1942 at the Wannsee Conference in Berlin." Ijabs also disagreed with the contention in the film by the British literary historian, liberal, and former political activist George Watson that Friedrich Engels is "the ancestor of the modern political genocide." Further, Ijabs refuted the film's criticism of Karl Marx as being the 'progenitor of modern genocide', although he acknowledged the use of the term Völkerabfälle in Karl Marx's newspaper. (Note: Although sometimes translated as "racial trash", other translations of Völkerabfälle include "residual nations" or "refuse of nations", that is those left behind, or discarded, by the dominant civilizations. This view has also been criticized by reviewer Robert Grant as ideologically biased and for citing evidence that "seems dubious", arguing that "what Marx and Engels are calling for is ... at the very least a kind of cultural genocide; but it is not obvious, at least from Watson's citations, that actual mass killing, rather than (to use their phraseology) mere 'absorption' or 'assimilation', is in question.")

Boris Vadimovich Sokolov, one of the historians interviewed in the film, was quoted as saying: "I had only been an expert there and I can only answer for what I am saying there myself. I had told to Šnore that some of his narratives are obvious forgeries he was tricked by. For example, Beria—Müller agreement on killing Jews together."

In Lauren Wissot's review for Slant Magazine, "Soviet Story does a thorough job of laying out what happened, but its dull, educational-style format doesn't guide us to the next step of why we should care." In his Time Out review, Joshua Rothkopf stated: "An offensively schlocky treatment of an important subject, The Soviet Story turns Stalin's systematic starvation and slaughter of millions into a hopped-up horror flick."

== Film festivals and awards ==
The Soviet Story has been screened in the following film festivals:

- 2008 Boston Film Festival – Boston, Massachusetts; received the "Mass Impact Award"
- 2008 KinoLev Film Festival – Lviv, Ukraine
- 2008 Black Nights Film Festival – Tallinn, Estonia
- 2008 Arsenals Film Festival – Riga, Latvia
- 2008 Promitey Film Festival – Tbilisi, Georgia
- 2008 Baltic Film Festival – Berlin, Germany
- 2009 Sedona International Film Festival – Sedona, Arizona
- 2009 Mene Tekel festival – Prague, Czech Republic
- 2009 Politicsonfilm Film Festival – Washington, D.C.
- 2011 Free Minds Film Festival – Colorado Springs, Colorado
- 2012 Free Minds Film Festival – Colorado Springs, Colorado

In 2008, the president of Latvia, Valdis Zatlers awarded the director Edvīns Šnore with the Order of the Three Stars. In 2009, the film was nominated for the biannual Latvian National Film Award Lielais Kristaps in the "Best Documentary" category. In the same year, Šnore received the Estonian Order of the Cross of Terra Mariana for creating The Soviet Story.

== See also ==
- Comparison of Nazism and Stalinism
- Double genocide theory
- Anatomy of Ruscism
