= Viktor Zemskov =

Soviet and Russian historian (1946–2015)

Viktor Nikolaevich Zemskov
- Виктор Николаевич Земсков
- Born: 30 January 1946; Soviet Union
- Died: 22 July 2015 (aged 69)
- Citizenship: Russia
- Education: Moscow State University
- Known for: Studies on political repression in the Soviet Union
- Scientific career
- Fields: History
- Workplaces: Institute of Russian History (Russian Academy of Sciences)

Viktor Nikolaevich Zemskov (Russian: Ви́ктор Никола́евич Земско́в, 30 January 1946 – 22 June 2015) was a Soviet and Russian historian, doctor (habil.) of historical sciences (2005), and research associate of the Institute of Russian History of the Russian Academy of Sciences. He was a specialist on the Gulag. Zemskov revealed in detail the secret-police statistics about the Gulag, resolving many disputes among Western historians about the number of people affected by political repression in the Soviet Union.

== Education and career ==
In 1981, Zemskov defended his candidate's (PhD) thesis "Contribution by working class to strengthening the material-technical base of agriculture in the USSR in the 1960s". In 1989, he joined the commission of the History Department of the USSR Academy of Sciences led by its corresponding member Yuri Polyakov to determine population losses and received access to statistical reports made by the OGPU-NKVD-MGB-MVD and kept in the Central State Archive of the October Revolution (CSAOR), now the State Archive of the Russian Federation. Between 1990 and 1992, he published the first precise statistical data on the Gulag which were based on the Gulag archives. According to Leonid Lopatnikov, Zemskov was the only historian admitted to the archives for the reports, and later the archives were again "closed."

Zemskov's papers were criticized by Sergei Maksudov. In Maksudov's opinion, Lev Razgon and his followers, including Aleksandr Solzhenitsyn, did not accurately enumerate the total number of the camps and markedly exaggerated their size. At the same time, from their experience, they knew something extraordinarily important about the Archipelago - its diabolical nature. On the other hand, Zemskov, who published many documents by the NKVD and KGB, is very far from understanding of the Gulag essence and the nature of socio-political processes in the country. Without distinguishing the degree of accuracy and reliability of certain figures, without making a critical analysis of sources, without comparing new data with already known information, Zemskov absolutizes the published materials by presenting them as the ultimate truth. As a result, in Maksudov's view, Zemskov's attempts to make generalized statements with reference to a particular document, as a rule, do not hold water. In response, Zemskov wrote that the charge that he allegedly did not compare new data with already known information could not be called fair. In his words, most western writers did not benefit from such comparisons. Zemskov added that when he tried not to overuse the juxtaposition of new information with "old" data, it was only because of a sense of delicacy, not to once again psychologically traumatize the researchers whose works used figures that turned out to be incorrect after the publication of the statistics by the OGPU-NKVD-MGB-MVD.

In 2005, Zemskov defended his doctoral thesis "Special settlers in the USSR. 1930–1960".

== Publications ==
- Getty, Arch; Rittersporn, Gábor; Zemskov, Viktor (October 1993). "Victims of the Soviet penal system in the pre-war years: a first approach on the basis of archival evidence". American Historical Review. 98 (4): 1017–1049. doi:10.2307/2166597. JSTOR 2166597.
- Getty, Arch; Rittersporn, Gábor; Zemskov, Viktor (1993). "Les victimes de la répression pénale dans l'U.R.S.S. d'avant-guerre : une première enquête à partir du témoignage des archives" [Victims of the Soviet penal system in the pre-war years: a first approach on the basis of archival evidence]. Revue des études slaves (in French). 65 (4): 631–670. doi:10.3406/slave.1993.6134. JSTOR 43270097.
- ГУЛАГ (историко-социологический аспект) // Социологические исследования. 1991. No. 7. С. 3–16.
- ГУЛАГ (историко-социологический аспект) // Социологические исследования. 1991. No. 6. С. 10–27.
- Демография заключенных, спецпоселенцев и ссыльных (30-е — 50-е годы) // Мир России. 1999. Т. VIII. No. 4. С. 114–124.
- К вопросу о масштабах репрессий в СССР // Социологические исследования. 1995. No. 9. С. 118–127.
- Об учете спецконтингента НКВД во всесоюзных переписях населения 1937 и 1939 гг. // Социологические исследования. 1991. No. 2. С. 74–75.
- Репатриация советских граждан и их дальнейшая судьба (1944–1956 гг.) // Социологические исследования. 1995. No. 6. С. 3–13.
- Репатриация советских граждан и их дальнейшая судьба (1944–1956 гг.) // Социологические исследования. May 1995. No. 5. С. 3–13.
- Рождение «Второй эмиграции» (1944–1952) // Социологические исследования. 1991. No. 4. С. 3–24.
- Спецпоселенцы (по документам НКВД-МВД СССР) // Социологические исследования. 1990. No. 11. С. 3–17.
- Судьба «кулацкой ссылки» в послевоенное время // Социологические исследования. 1992. No. 8. С. 18–37.
- «Кулацкая ссылка» накануне и в годы Великой отечественной войны // Социологические исследования. 1992. No. 2. С. 3–26.
- Политические репрессии в СССР (1917–1990 гг.). // Россия XXI, 1994, No. 1–2. С. 107–124.

== Books ==
- Спецпоселенцы в СССР, 1930–1960. — Москва: Наука, 2005. — 306 страниц, ISBN 5-02-010315-2
- Сталин и народ. Почему не было восстания. — Москва: Алгоритм, 2014. — 239 страниц, ISBN 978-5-4438-0677-8
- Народ и война: Страницы истории советского народа накануне и в годы Великой Отечественной войны. 1938–1945. — Москва, 2014. — 288 страниц.

== Video ==
- Video containing an interview with Viktor Zemskov about statistics of political repression in the USSR (in English) on YouTube
