= George Watson (scholar) =

British literary historian and former liberal political activist

George Grimes Watson
- Born: 13 October 1927; Brisbane, Australia
- Died: 2 August 2013 (aged 85); Cambridge, United Kingdom
- Education: University of Queensland; Trinity College, Oxford
- Occupations: Writer, scholar

George Grimes Watson (13 October 1927 – 2 August 2013) was an anti-communist scholar, literary critic and historian. He was a fellow of St John's College, Cambridge, and professor of English at Cambridge University.

== Early life ==
Watson was born in Brisbane, Australia, on 13 October 1927. He was educated at Brisbane Boys' College and the University of Queensland, where he graduated in English in 1948. He secured a scholarship for a second degree and graduated in English from Trinity College at Oxford University in 1950.

== Career ==
A talented linguist, he worked for the European Commission, both as an interpreter and checking its publications. Watson became a lecturer of English at Cambridge University in 1959 and a fellow of St John's College in 1961.

Watson met C. S. Lewis at Oxford's Socratic Club in 1948 and attended his lectures. Later, he counted him among his finest professors and, after Watson joined Cambridge, among his colleagues. Among Watson's English students at St John's was Douglas Adams.

Watson held the Sandars Readership in Bibliography at Cambridge in 1991-1992 and lectured on "Lord Acton and his library."

== Politics and views ==
Watson was an active member of the Liberal Party, and he was a member of Liberal Party co-ownership committee from 1951 to 1957. He stood in Cheltenham in the 1959 United Kingdom general election. In the 1979 European Parliament election in the United Kingdom, he fought the Leicester European Parliament constituency. He was senior treasurer of the Cambridge University Liberal Club from 1978 to 1992. In his will, Watson left £950,000 to the Liberal Democrats and the painting Rocky Landscape with Saint John the Baptist by Joos de Momper to the National Gallery, London.

Watson contributed to Encounter, a Cold-War intellectual journal, and published material arguing that Adolf Hitler was a Marxist, and that socialism promoted genocide and kleptocracy. He was featured in the 2008 documentary film The Soviet Story where he argued that Karl Marx was responsible for coming up with the idea of genocide. For this, he was criticised by Latvian political scientist and cultural commentator Ivars Ijabs and Robert Grant, who argue that Watson's views are based on mistranslation and distortion reflecting his ideological bias. The translation of Völkerabfälle as "racial trash" lay at the centre of this, with defenders of Marx and Friedrich Engels saying that a proper translation would be "residual fragments of peoples". Also Watson translated "Revolutionären weltsturm" to "revolutionary holocaust", which was controversial.

In the Lost Literature of Socialism (1998), Watson cited an 1849 article written by Engels called "The Hungarian Struggle" and published in Marx's journal Neue Rheinische Zeitung, (Note: The quote of Watson's interest reads: "Among all the large and small nations of Austria, only three standard-bearers of progress took an active part in history, and still retain their vitality — the Germans, the Poles and the Magyars. Hence they are now revolutionary. All the other large and small nationalities and peoples are destined to perish before long in the revolutionary world storm. For that reason they are now counter-revolutionary. ... There is no country in Europe which does not have in some corner or other one or several ruined fragments of peoples, the remnant of a former population that was suppressed and held in bondage by the nation which later became the main vehicle of historical development. These relics of a nation mercilessly trampled under foot in the course of history, as Hegel says, these residual fragments of peoples always become fanatical standard-bearers of counter-revolution and remain so until their complete extirpation or loss of their national character, just as their whole existence in general is itself a protest against a great historical revolution. Such, in Scotland, are the Gaels, the supporters of the Stuarts from 1640 to 1745. Such, in France, are the Bretons, the supporters of the Bourbons from 1792 to 1800. Such, in Spain, are the Basques, the supporters of Don Carlos. Such, in Austria, are the pan-Slavist Southern Slavs, who are nothing but the residual fragment of peoples, resulting from an extremely confused thousand years of development. ... The Magyars are not yet defeated. But if they fall, they will fall gloriously, as the last heroes of the 1848 revolution, and only for a short time. Then for a time the Slav counter-revolution will sweep down on the Austrian monarchy with all its barbarity, and the camarilla will see what sort of allies it has. But at the first victorious uprising of the French proletariat, which Louis Napoleon is striving with all his might to conjure up, the Austrian Germans and Magyars will be set free and wreak a bloody revenge on the Slav barbarians. The general war which will then break out will smash this Slav Sonderbund and wipe out all these petty hidebound nations, down to their very names. The next world war will result in the disappearance from the face of the earth not only of reactionary classes and dynasties, but also of entire reactionary peoples. And that, too, is a step forward.") stating that the writings of Engels and others show that "the Marxist theory of history required and demanded genocide for reasons implicit in its claim that feudalism, which in advanced nations was already giving place to capitalism, must in its turn be superseded by socialism. Entire nations would be left behind after a workers' revolution, feudal remnants in a socialist age, and since they could not advance two steps at a time, they would have to be killed. They were racial trash, as Engels called them, and fit only for the dung-heap of history." Watson's claims have been criticised by Robert Grant for "dubious" evidence, arguing that "what Marx and Engels are calling for is ... at the very least a kind of cultural genocide; but it is not obvious, at least from Watson's citations, that actual mass killing, rather than (to use their phraseology) mere 'absorption' or 'assimilation', is in question." Talking about Engels' 1849 article and citing Watson's book, historian Andrzej Walicki wrote: "It is difficult to deny that this was an outright call for genocide."

In the film The Soviet Story, Watson stated at minute 16:37 that Engels is "the ancestor of the modern political genocide." While confirming the use of the term Völkerabfälle in Marx's daily newspaper to describe several small European ethnic groups, Ivars Ijabs responded: "To present Karl Marx as the 'progenitor of modern genocide' is simply to lie."

== Works ==
=== Books ===
Watson's works, many of them reprinted, in the Library of Congress include:

- Cambridge Bibliography of English Literature, Vols. 1–5 (1969–1977)
- Unservile State, Essays in Liberty and Welfare (1957)
- Concise Cambridge Bibliography of English Literature (1958)
- British Constitution and Europe (1959)
- Dryden: 'Of Dramatic Poesy' and Other Critical Essays, 2 vols (1962)
- Literary Critics, a Study of English Descriptive Criticism (1962)
- Literary Critics, a Study of English Descriptive Criticism (1964)
- Concise Cambridge Bibliography of English Literature, 600–1950 (1965)
- Coleridge the Poet (1966)
- Is Socialism Left? (1967, 1972)
- Study of Literature (1968)
- New Cambridge Bibliography of English Literature, edited by George Watson (1969)
- Literary English since Shakespeare, edited by George Watson (1970)
- The English Ideology, studies in the language of Victorian politics (1973)
- Literary Critics, a study of English descriptive criticism (1973, 1986)
- Politics and Literature in Modern Britain (1977)
- The Discipline of English: A Guide to Critical Theory and Practice (1978, 1979)
- Castle Rackrent by Maria Edgeworth, edited with an introduction by George Watson (1980, 1995, 2008)
- Shorter New Cambridge Bibliography of English Literature (1981)
- Idea of Liberalism: Studies for A New Map of Politics (1985)
- Writing a Thesis: A Guide to Long Essays and Dissertations (1987)
- Certainty of Literature: Essays in Polemic (1989)
- Biographia Literaria, or, Biographical Sketches of My Literary Life and Opinions by Samuel Taylor Coleridge, edited and with an introduction by George Watson (1991)
- Critical Essays on C. S. Lewis, edited by George Watson (1992)
- Lord Acton's History of Liberty, a study of his library, with an edited text of his History of Liberty Notes (1994)
- The Lost Literature of Socialism (2nd ed.). Cambridge: Lutterworth Press. 2010 – via Internet Archive.
- Never Ones for Theory?: England and the War of Ideas (2002)
- Take Back the Past: Myths of the Twentieth Century (2007)
- Heresies and Heretics: Memories of the Twentieth Century (2013)

=== Articles ===
- "Were the Intellectuals Duped?", Encounter (December 1973)
- "Millar or Marx?", The Wilson Quarterly (Winter 1993)
- "The Art of Disagreement: C. S. Lewis (1898-1963)", The Hudson Review, Vol. 48, No. 2 (Summer 1995), pp. 229-239
- "The Messiah of Modernism: F. R. Leavis (1895–1978)", The Hudson Review, Vol. 50, No. 2 (Summer 1997), pp. 227–241.
- "Hitler and the Socialist Dream", The Independent (November 1998)
- "Remembering Prufrock: Hugh Sykes Davies 1909–1984", Jacket (Fall 2001)
