= Cambridge Bibliography of English Literature =

The Cambridge Bibliography of English Literature is an encyclopaedic bibliography of literature in English published by the Cambridge University Press.

It was first published in the 1940s, and a revised edition was issued from 1969 with the prefix New.

A third series was launched in 1999, without the prefix, but by 2022 only volume 4 had appeared.

== First series ==
- Volume I, 600–1660, ed. F. W. Bateson (1940)
- Volume II, 1660–1800, ed. F. W. Bateson (1941)
- Volume III, 1800–1900, ed. F. W. Bateson (1940)
- Volume IV, Index, ed. F. W. Bateson (1940)
- Volume V, Supplement: A.D. 600–1900, ed. George Watson (1940)

== The New Cambridge Bibliography of English Literature ==
- Volume 1, 600–1660, ed. George Watson (1974)
- Volume 2, 1660–1800, ed. George Watson, Ian R. Willison, J. D. Pickles (1971)
- Volume 3, 1800–1900, ed. George Watson (1969)
- Volume 4, 1900–1950, ed. George Watson, Ian Willison (1972)
- Volume 5, Index, ed. George Watson, J. D. Pickles, Ian R. Willison (1977)

== Third edition ==
- Volume 4, 1800–1900, ed. Joanne Shattock (1999)

== Concise series ==
- Concise Cambridge Bibliography of English Literature, ed. George Watson (1958)
- Concise Cambridge Bibliography of English Literature, 600–1950 ed. George Watson (1965)
