= Edvīns Šnore =

Latvian film director

Dr. Edvīns Šnore
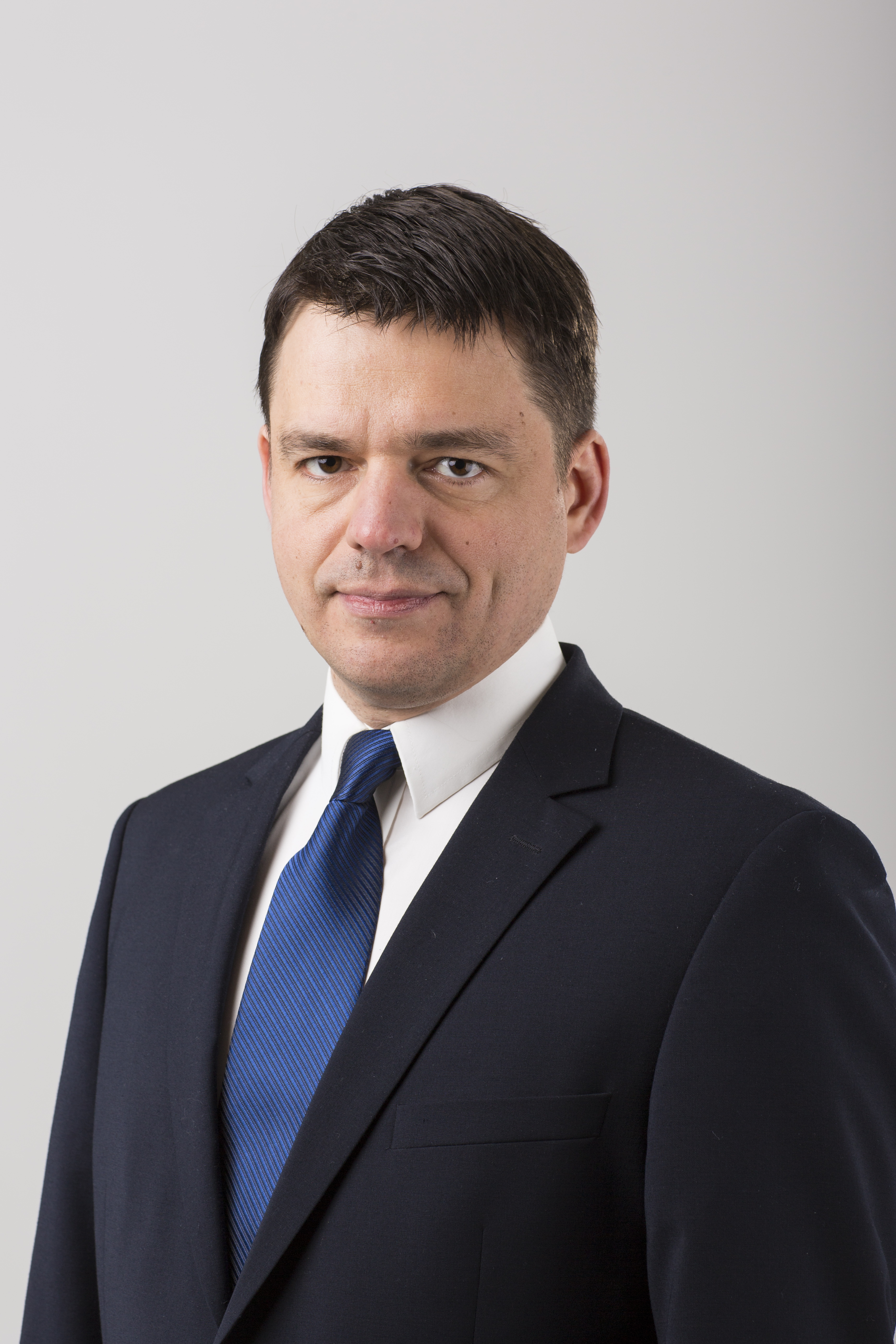
- Born: 21 March 1974 (age 52); Saulkrasti, Latvian SSR
- Education: Doctorate
- Alma mater: University of Latvia
- Occupations: director, writer, editor
- Known for: The Soviet Story
- Political party: National Alliance

Edvīns Šnore (born 21 March 1974, in Saulkrasti) is a Latvian film director and politician. He was elected to a four-year term in the Latvian Saeima in 2014 and 2018.

== Biography ==
Šnore's family comes from Kuldīga. He went to high school in Riga. During the Revolutions of 1989 he sympathized with the Popular Front of Latvia. He first studied political science in Norway, and then earned his master's degree at the University of Latvia. In 2013 he completed his Doctoral thesis on the Western European view of Holodomor.

Šnore has become known for his 2008 documentary The Soviet Story. For this film, he was awarded with the Latvian Order of the Three Stars in 2008, and the Estonian Order of the Cross of Terra Mariana in 2009. In 2016 Šnore released another documentary called The Unknown War: Baltic Resistance on the guerrilla war in the Baltic states.

== Views ==
In his article "The goal: A Latvian Latvia", E. Šnore expressed his views about the Russians in Latvia, as well as the Russian language as such. According to him, "… the Russophone immigrants of the Soviet times disparage and rail at Latvia all the time, yet still do not leave it. At least, not at the rate desired by the Latvians". He also refers to Minister of Social Affairs of Latvia Alfreds Bērziņš saying "… the Russian louse, once let into a coat, is hard to get rid of" and Paul A. Goble that "…the Russian language is exactly the primary weapon of the Kremlin's hybrid war against the Baltic States". E. Šnore concludes that "… the Latvian Latvia <…> is the only way towards a prosperous, safe and united Latvia".

Mr Šnore was given an oral warning by the parliamentary ethics commission. The article and the mild reaction to it have drawn criticism from European Commission against Racism and Intolerance. and the Advisory Committee on the Framework Convention for the Protection of National Minorities.
