= Völkerabfälle =

Theory of nations by Frederick Engels

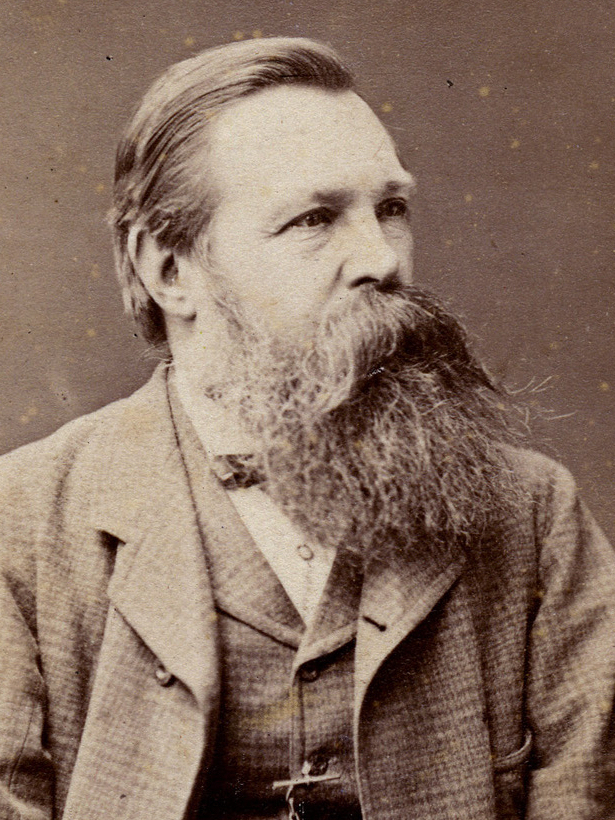
Frederick Engels in May 1877

Völkerabfälle (in German) is a term used by Frederick Engels to describe small nations which he considered residual fragments of former peoples who had succumbed to more powerful neighbours in the historic process of social development and which Engels considered prone to become "fanatical standard-bearers of counter-revolution". This term was originally published in Neue Rheinische Zeitung.

He offers as examples:

- the Jacobites: "Such, in Scotland, are the Gaels, the supporters of the Stuarts from 1640 to 1745."
- the Chouannerie: "Such, in France, are the Bretons, the supporters of the Bourbons from 1792 to 1800."
- the First Carlist War: "Such, in Spain, are the Basques, the supporters of Don Carlos."

Engels was referring also specifically to the Serb uprising of 1848–49, in which Serbs from Vojvodina fought against the previously victorious Hungarian revolution. Engels finished the article with the following prediction:

But at the first victorious uprising of the French proletariat, which Louis Napoleon is striving with all his might to conjure up, the Austrian Germans and Magyars will be set free and wreak a bloody revenge on the Slav barbarians. The general war which will then break out will smash this Slav Sonderbund and wipe out all these petty hidebound nations, down to their very names.

The next world war will result in the disappearance from the face of the earth not only of reactionary classes and dynasties, but also of entire reactionary peoples. And that, too, is a step forward.

== Critique ==
Engels' views were criticised by leading socialist Karl Kautsky who in 1915 argued that subsequent to 1848/9 the Czech and Austrian South Slavs had transformed themselves in a manner which in practice refuted the views of Marx and Engels. Referring to Heinrich Cunow he wrote:

Today when those people have achieved such great power and significance to refer to them in the old Marxian terms of 1848/9 does appear most unfortunate. Should someone today still hold onto that standpoint he has a lot to unlearn

Roman Rosdolsky analyses Engels' position in his book Engels and the 'Nonhistoric' Peoples: the National Question in the Revolution of 1848.

There are two ways to look at Marx and Engels: as the creators of a brilliant, but in its deepest essence, thoroughly critical, scientific method; or as church fathers of some sort, the bronzed figures of a monument. Those who have the latter vision will not have found this study to their taste. We, however, prefer to see them as they were in reality.

Rosdolsky examines Engels' viewpoint at length. Both Marx and Engels had supported the 1848 revolution which had spread throughout Europe. They saw this as a necessary first step towards the Socialist revolution, which was hoped to be imminent. However, the forces of reaction rallied in Klemens von Metternich's Austria in October 1848 with the brutal suppression of the Vienna Uprising. Engels was prompted to write his article thanks to the Austrian Slavs' rejection of the opportunity to liberate themselves from the oppressive rule of the Habsburgs, as well their enthusiastic embrace of Metternich’s counter-revolution.

== Controversy ==
This last passage, the final paragraph of Engels' article in 1849, was analysed by the British literary historian and anti-communist George Watson, who translated of Völkerabfälle to racial trash, and concluded that Hitler was a Marxist. Some such as political scientist Ivars Ijabs claim that this was a distortion based on his anti-communist ideological bias.
