= Alexander Babyonyshev =

Soviet-born historian and demographer

Alexander Petrovich Babyonyshev
- Occupations: geologist, historian, sociologist, demographer, human rights activist, publisher
- Writing career
- Pen name: Sergey Maksudov
- Language: Russian, English

Alexander P. Babyonyshev (Russian: Александр Петрович Бабёнышев; pseudonym Sergei Maksudov Russian: Сергей Максудов; March 10, 1938, Rostov-on-Don - August 30, 2026 Brookline, Massachusetts) was a Soviet and US geologist, historian, demographer, and sociologist. He was a specialist in the study of the loss of the Soviet population.

== Biography ==
Son of Sarah Emmanuilovna Babёnysheva (1910–2007), a literary critic, a member of the Union of Soviet Writers, in 1970 an employee of the Fund of assistance to political prisoners and their families. In 1961 he graduated from the Russian State Geological Prospecting University in Moscow. He worked in the hydro projects. In 1964 he moved from the Geological Department in the implementation of a group of mathematical methods and computers. In 1971 he defended his thesis on "The division of the earth formation with geotechnical studies using probabilistic and statistical methods". In 1972–1980 Senior Researcher, Institute of development of fossil fuels. In the years 1960–1970 participated in the human rights movement in the USSR. He speaks out in defense of Andrei Sinyavsky and Yuli Daniel. To protest against the Soviet invasion of Czechoslovakia (distributed leaflets), has signed a letter of protest against the expulsion of Solzhenitsyn. In the years 1968–1980 to collect and send information to "Chronicle of Current Events". Author, editor and distributor of samizdat. In May 1964 he visited the exiled poet Joseph Brodsky, brought him as a gift from Lydia Chukovskaya a book of John Donne's poetry. One of the authors of "Sakharov collection", later published in six languages (preface to the German edition wrote Heinrich Böll and Lev Kopelev). He participated in helping families of political prisoners. He was one of the compilers, authors and publishers of the magazine "Searches and Reflections" (Moscow, 1980–1981). His first publication on the assessment of the Soviet population losses during the civil war, collectivization and World War II was published in the journal «Cahiers du monde russe» in Paris in 1977.

At the end of March 1980 he went to Gorky, to meet with exiled to academic Andrei Sakharov. Since it was already known that the house Sakharov was staying at would not let anyone in, it was decided to check whether he could get Sakharov to go to visit his friends. For this conscientious objector Mark Kovner gave his empty apartment, and passed through Babonyshev Elena Bonner invitation Andrei Dmitrievich at Shrovetide pancakes. Six or seven employees of the KGB had not allowed Sakharov to the yard of the house where they waited Babonyshev. Then the next day Babonyshev sending family in Moscow, Sakharov came to a house and knocked on the window. Andrei opened it, Alexander got into the apartment through a window and they talked for several hours. Thereafter Babonyshev was arrested and police post was moved from the lobby entrance directly outside Sahkarov's apartment door.

Babonyshev was dismissed from his job in detention, searches and interrogations (1979–1981). In 1981 he was forced to emigrate to the US, living in Boston.

He has taught and done research at Harvard and Boston Universities and at the Ukrainian Institute in Edmonton (Canada). Babyonyshev also edited magazines: Страна и мир (журнал), "USSR: The internal contradictions", "Tribune." Author and "Sakharov collection of" books "of the USSR population losses", "Unheard voices." The documents of the Smolensk archives. "Fists and party members", "Chechen and Russian. Victory, defeat, loss », Russian Reforms: Revolutions from Above . He has written about a hundred papers published in the journals "The country and the world", "USSR: The internal contradictions", "Tribuna", "Rural youth", "Forum", "Russia", "Bulletin of RHD", "Problems of Eastern Europe" "New journal», «Holocaust and Genocide Studies» « Suchasnist", "Philosophical and sociological thought, " Syntax " ," Soviet Studies "(and now" Europe-Asia Studies "), the Slavic Review, The Times Literary Supplement, "Russian Literature of North Holland", "of Cahiers du monde russe", "the Journal of Ukrainian Studies", "the Harvard Ukrainian Studies", Free thought, "Literary Review" UFO Book Review, UFO, in the anthology" The past "and "Links" and in the newspapers, "New Russian word", "Russian thought", "Moscow news" Independent gazette, "Novaya Gazeta".

== Works ==
=== Books ===
- Babёnyshev Alexander . Most, most ... // MA Vilnius Kid. 1976. 16 p .
- About Volcanoes // M .: Kid. 1980. 16.
- Multivariate statistical analysis in engineering geology. M., 1976 (co-authored with I. Komarov and Jaime NN)
- Sakharov collection. (With R. Lert and E. Pechuro, M. Samizdat, 1981 (translated into English, French, German, Italian and Swedish), the second edition of AM 1991, AM 2011 Third Edition.
- Sergei Maksudov. Unheard voices. Documents Smolensk Archive. Fists and party members. Ann Arbor: Ardis. 1987
- The loss of the Soviet population. Chalidze Publication. Benson, USA. 1989 Russian Reforms: Revolution from Above (in collaboration with N. Pokrovskaya). Boston first edition in 1995, eight in 2014 (textbook for Americans studying Russian language)
- Chechens and Russian. Victory, defeat, loss. M. 2010
- Blind leaders. Taunton MA USA 2012

=== Articles ===
- Sergti Maksudov. Pertes subies par la population de L'URSS 1918–1958. CAHIERS DU MONDE RUSSE ET SOVIETIQUE, XVIII, N3, 1977. Paris, pp. 223–265. «Victory over the Pesantry.» Hunger by Design. pp. 53–101, Cambridge MA, 2008; The Jewish Population Losses of the USSR from the Holocaust. The Holocaust in the Soviet Union. New York-London, 1993.
- Not his. (Response to the publication of a book by Solzhenitsyn, "Two Hundred Years Together") (Internet.)
