= Boris Vadimovich Sokolov =

Russian historian

Boris Sokolov (Russian: Бори́с Вади́мович Соколо́в) is a historian and a Russian literature researcher (he a has Candidate of Science degree in History and Habilitat Doctor of Science in Philology). In 1979 he graduated from the department of geography of the Moscow State University, specialising in economic geography. His works have been translated into Japanese, Polish, Latvian and Estonian. He has also translated literary works from various languages.

During Soviet times, he worked at the Institute of World Literature. Subsequently, he served as a professor of social anthropology at Russian State Social University. From the 1990s onwards, he has turned to subjects on Russian 20th century history, publishing studies on Lavrentiy Beria, Joseph Stalin, Vyacheslav Molotov and Leonid Brezhnev. He is one of the Russian historians alongside those who are critically reviewing the part of the Soviet Union in the Second World War. In 2016, he was expelled from the Free Historical Society for “inappropriate handling of historical sources and incorrect quoting of other people's works.”

== Criticism ==
=== Historical errors ===
Sokolov is one of the experts of the film The Soviet Story, which caused controversial assessments and accusations of manipulation and falsification.

S. Milovanov, in his Ph.D. thesis, counts Sokolov among those who are now resuscitating the “myths of Hitler's propaganda". Without naming it specifically, he even refers to false documents distributed by the Nazis.

Many of Russian historians, sociologists and publicists consider the data on the losses of the Red Army during the Great Patriotic War, given in the publications of B.V. Sokolov, to be unreliable. In 1990, in his book “The Price of Victory,” Sokolov estimated that 14.7 million Soviet military personnel died. Since 1993, B.V. Sokolov estimates the total number of Soviet military deaths in 1941-1945 at 26.4 million people. Academician of the Russian Academy of Sciences, sociologist Gennady Osipov described B.V. Sokolov as “the most tireless “professional” falsifier,” and called his calculations absurd, since “over all the years of the war, 34.5 million people were mobilized (taking into account the pre-war number of military personnel), of which about 27 million people were direct participants in the war. After the end of the war, there were about 13 million people in the Soviet Army. Of the 27 million participants in the war, 26.4 million could not have died”.

On May 12, 2016, he was expelled from the Free Historical Society for “inappropriate handling of historical sources and incorrect quoting of other people's works.”

=== Other ===
In September 2008 he had to resign under pressure of the Administration of then-President Dmitry Medvedev. After publishing the article 'Did Saakashvili lose?', he wrote numerous monographs, e.g. on Gogol, Sergei Esenin, and Mikhail Bulgakov (Sokolov was the author of the Bulgakov Encyclopedia, published in 1996).

He denies the anthropogenic nature of global warming.

== Bibliography ==
- Б. В. Соколов Булгаков. Энциклопедия. Алгоритм, 2003. ISBN 5-320-00143-6
- Б. В. Соколов Вторая мировая. Факты и версии ISBN 5-462-00445-1
- Б. В. Соколов Оккупация. Правда и мифы Moscow, AST, 2002. online version
- Третий Рейх. Мифы и действительность Эксмо, Яуза, 2005
- Б.В. Соколов Правда о Великой Отечественной войне (Сборник статей). – СПб.: Алетейя, 1999 (online text)
- Соколов Б.В. Неизвестный Жуков: портрет без ретуши в зеркале эпохи. (Unknown Zhukov by B.V. Sokolov) – Мн.: Родиола-плюс, 2000 – 608 с. («Мир в войнах»). ISBN 985-448-036-4. (online text)
- Б. В. Соколов. Михаил Булгаков: Загадки судьбы. Москва: Вагриус, 2008.
- Б. В. Соколов. Михаил Булгаков: Загадки творчества. Москва: Вагриус, 2008.
- Б.В. Соколов. Тухачевский. Москва: Молодая гвардия, 2008.
- Sokolov, B.V.: World War II Revisited: Did Stalin Intend to Attack Hitler?- In: Journal of Slavic Military Studies 11 (1998), H. 2, p. 113–141
- B.V. Sokolov. How to Calculate Human Losses during the Second World War // Journal of Slavic Military Studies, 2009, September, Vol. 22, pp. 437–458
- Б. В. Соколов. Врангель. — М.: Молодая гвардия, 2009—512 с ("Жизнь замечательных людей")ISBN 978-5-235-03294-1
- Б.В. Соколов Рокоссовский. — М.: Молодая гвардия, 2010—560 с ("Жизнь замечательных людей")ISBN 978-5-235-03233-0
- Б.В. Соколов. Кто воевал числом, а кто - умением. М.: Яуза-пресс, 2011-288 с. ISBN 978-5-9955-0255-5
- Б.В. Соколов. Россия и СССР на бойне. Людские потери в войнах XX века. М.: Яуза-пресс, 2013-448 с. ISBN 978-5-9955-0632-4
- Sokolov Boris V. The Role of the Soviet Union in the Second World War: A Re-examination (Helion Studies in Military History #14). London: Helion Publishers, 2013. 148 p. ISBN 978-1-909982-42-0
- Sokolov Boris V. Marshal K.K. Rokossovsky: The Red Army's Gentleman Commander. London: Helion Publishers, 2015.496 p. ISBN 978-1-909982-10-9
- Sokolov Boris V. Myths and Legends of the Eastern Front: Reassessing the Great Patriotic War. Transl by Richard W Harrison Barnsley South Yorkshire: Pen & Sword Military, 2019. 400 p. ISBN 9781526742261
- Б.В. Соколов. Людские потери России и СССР в войнах XX-XXI вв. М.: Новый хронограф, 2022. 768 с. ISBN 9785948815183
