= World War II casualties =

Human losses by participating country

World War II deaths by country

World War II (WWII) was the deadliest military conflict in history. An estimated total of 60–75 million deaths were caused by the conflict, including those who died from deprivation, famine and disease. This represents about 3% of the estimated global population of 2.3 billion in 1940. Deaths directly caused by the war (including military and civilian fatalities) are estimated at 50–56 million, with an additional estimated 19–28 million deaths from war-related disease and famine. Civilian deaths totaled 50–55 million. Military deaths from all causes totaled 21–25 million, including deaths in captivity of about five million prisoners of war. More than half of total deaths were in the Republic of China and the Soviet Union. The following tables give a detailed country-by-country count of human losses.

Recent historical scholarship has shed new light on the topic of WWII casualties. Research in Russia since the collapse of the Soviet Union has caused a revision of estimates of Soviet WWII fatalities. According to Russian government figures, Soviet losses within postwar borders now stand at 26.6 million, including 8 to 9 million due to famine and disease. In August 2009, the Polish Institute of National Remembrance (IPN) researchers estimated Poland's dead at between 5.6 and 5.8 million. Historian Rüdiger Overmans of the Military History Research Office (Germany) published a study in 2000 estimating the German military dead and missing at 5.3 million, including 900,000 men conscripted from outside of Germany's 1937 borders in Austria and in east-central Europe. The Soviet Red Army claimed responsibility for the majority of Wehrmacht casualties during WWII. The People's Republic of China puts its war dead at 20 million, while the Japanese government puts its casualties due to the war at 3.1 million. An estimated 7–10 million people died in the Dutch, British, French and US colonies in South and Southeast Asia, mostly from war-related famine.

== Classification of casualties ==
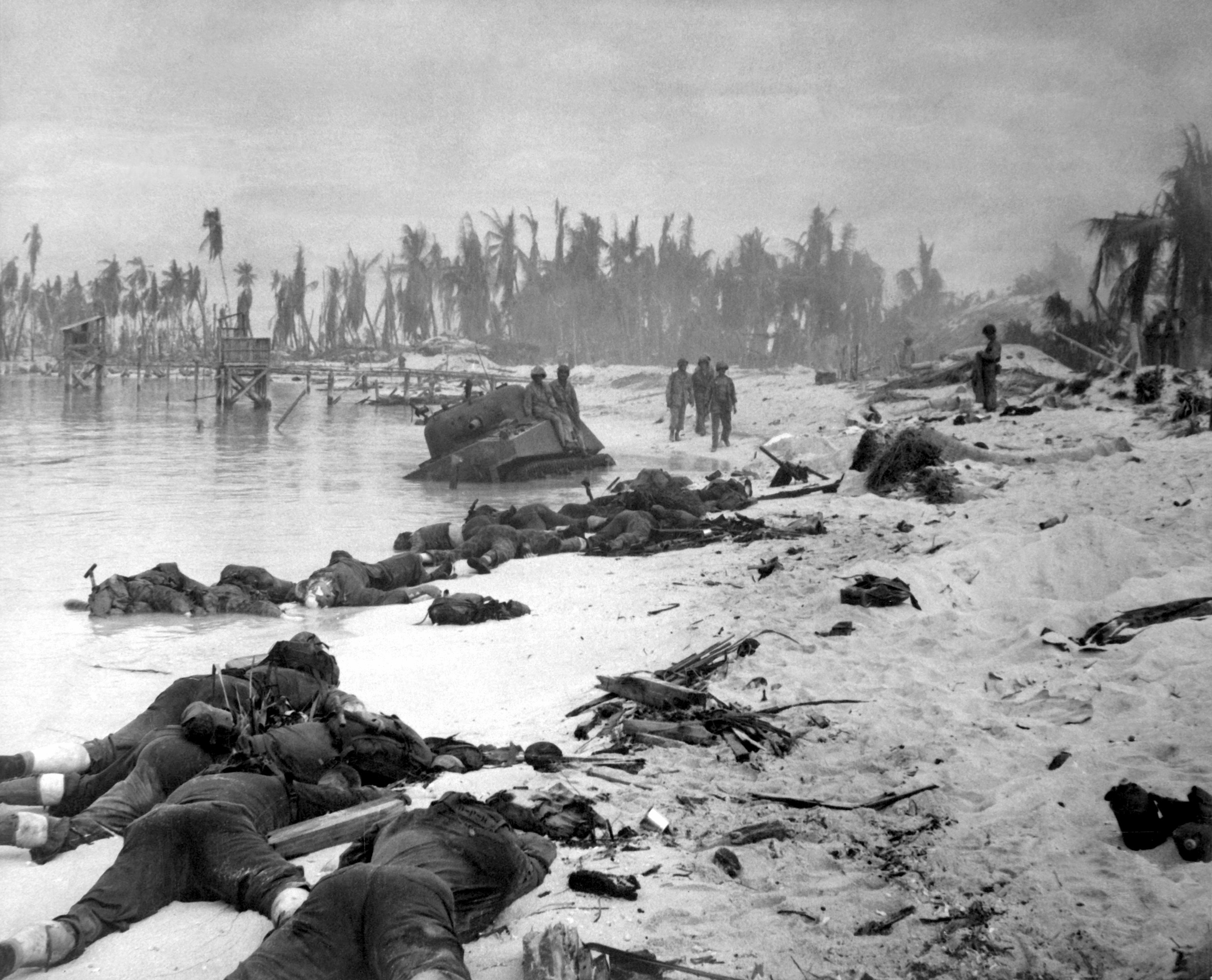
Bodies of U.S. Marines on the beach of Tarawa. The Marines secured the island after 76 hours of intense fighting. Over 1,000 American and ~4,600 Japanese troops died in the fighting.

Compiling or estimating the numbers of deaths and wounded caused during wars and other violent conflicts is a controversial subject. Historians often put forward many different estimates of the numbers killed and wounded during World War II. The authors of the Oxford Companion to World War II maintain that "casualty statistics are notoriously unreliable". The table below gives data on the number of dead and military wounded for each country, along with population information to show the relative impact of losses. When scholarly sources differ on the number of deaths in a country, a range of war losses is given, in order to inform readers that the death toll is disputed. Since casualty statistics are sometimes disputed the footnotes to this article present the different estimates by official governmental sources as well as historians. Military figures include battle deaths (KIA) and personnel missing in action (MIA), as well as fatalities due to accidents, disease and deaths of prisoners of war in captivity. Civilian casualties include deaths caused by strategic bombing, Holocaust victims, German war crimes, Japanese war crimes, population transfers in the Soviet Union, Allied war crimes, and deaths due to war-related famine and disease.

The sources for the casualties of the individual countries do not use the same methods, and civilian deaths due to starvation and disease make up a large proportion of the civilian deaths in China and the Soviet Union. The losses listed here are actual deaths; hypothetical losses due to a decline in births are not included with the total dead. The distinction between military and civilian casualties caused directly by warfare and collateral damage is not always clear-cut. For states that suffered huge losses such as the Soviet Union, China, Poland, Germany, and Yugoslavia, sources can give only the total estimated population loss caused by the war and a rough estimate of the breakdown of deaths caused by military activity, crimes against humanity and war-related famine. The casualties listed here include 19 to 25 million war-related famine deaths in the USSR, China, Indonesia, Vietnam, the Philippines, and India that are often omitted from other compilations of World War II casualties.

The footnotes give a detailed breakdown of the casualties and their sources, including data on the number of wounded where reliable sources are available. Several categories are used to classify World War II casualties, mainly to separate between military people and civilians. Due to the broad effects of war-induced famines, genocides like the Holocaust, and strategic bombings, civilian casualties frequently outnumbered military fatalities.

== Human losses by country ==
=== Total deaths by country ===
Country	Total population 1/1/1939	Military deaths from all causes	Civilian deaths due to military activity and crimes against humanity	Civilian deaths due to war-related famine and disease	Total deaths	Deaths as % of 1939 population	Average deaths as % of 1939 population	Military wounded
Albania ^{A}	1,073,000	30,000			30,000	2.80	2.80	NA
Australia ^{B}	6,968,000	39,700	700		40,400	0.58	0.58	39,803
(Nazi Germany) Austria (Unified with Germany) ^{C}	6,653,000	Included with Germany				(See table below.)^{S2}		Included with Germany
Belgium ^{D}	8,387,000	12,000	76,000		88,000	1.05	1.05	55,513
Brazil ^{E}	40,289,000	1,000	1,000		2,000	0.00	0.00	4,222
Bulgaria ^{F}	6,458,000	18,500	3,000		21,500	0.33	0.33	21,878
Burma (British colony) ^{G}	16,119,000	2,600	250,000 to 1,000,000		252,600 to 1,000,000	1.57 to 6.2	3.89	NA
Canada ^{H}	11,267,000	42,000	1,600		43,600	0.38	0.38	53,174
China ^{I} (1937–1945)	517,568,000	2,000,000 to 3,750,000+	7,357,000 to 8,191,000	5,000,000 to 10,000,000	14,000,000 to 20,000,000	2.90 to 3.86	3.38	1,761,335
Cuba ^{J}	4,235,000		100		100	0.00	0.00	NA
Czechoslovakia (in postwar 1945–1992 borders) ^{K}	14,612,000	35,000 to 46,000	294,000 to 320,000		340,000 to 355,000	2.33 to 2.43	2.38	8,017
Denmark ^{L}	3,795,000		6,000		6,000	0.16	0.16	2,000
Dutch East Indies ^{M}	69,435,000	11,500	300,000	2,400,000 to 4,000,000	3,000,000 to 4,000,000	4.3 to 5.76	5.03	NA
Egypt ^{MA}	16,492,000	1,100			1,100	0.00	0.00	NA
Estonia (within 1939 borders) ^{N}	1,134,000	34,000 (in both Soviet & German armed forces)	49,000		83,000	7.3	7.3	NA
Ethiopia ^{O}	17,700,000	15,000	85,000		100,000	0.56	0.56	NA
Finland ^{P}	3,700,000	94,700	2,100		96,800	2.62	2.62	197,000
France ^{Q} (including colonies)	41,680,000	210,000	390,000		600,000	1.44	1.44	390,000
French Indochina ^{R}	24,664,000			1,000,000 to 2,000,000	1,000,000 to 2,200,000	4.05 to 8.11	6.08	NA
Germany ^{S}	69,300,000	4,440,000 to 5,318,000	1,500,000 to 3,000,000 ^{S1}		6,900,000 to 7,400,000	(See table below.) ^{S2}		7,300,000
Greece ^{T}	7,222,000	35,100	171,800	300,000 to 600,000	507,000 to 807,000	7.02 to 11.17	9.095	47,290
(United States) Guam ^{TA}	22,800	1,000 to 2,000			1,000 to 2,000	4.39 to 8.77	6.58	NA
Hungary ^{U} (figures in 1938 borders not including territories annexed in 1938–41)	9,129,000	200,000	264,000 to 664,000		464,000 to 864,000	5.08 to 9.46	7.27	89,313
Iceland ^{V}	118,900		200		200	0.17	0.17	NA
India ^{W}	377,800,000	87,000		2,100,000 to 3,000,000	2,200,000 to 3,087,000	0.58	0.58	64,354
Iraq ^{Y}	3,698,000	500	200		700	0.01	0.01	NA
Ireland ^{Z}	2,960,000	5,000 Irish volunteers' deaths included with UK Armed Forces	100		5,100	0.00	0.17	NA
Italy (in postwar 1947 borders) ^{AA}	44,394,000	319,200 to 341,000 Italian nationals and c. 20,000 Africans conscripted by Italy	153,200		492,400 to 514,000	1.11 to 1.16	1.135	225,000 to 320,000 (incomplete data)
Japan ^{AB}	71,380,000	2,100,000 to 2,300,000	550,000 to 800,000		2,500,000 to 3,100,000	3.50 to 4.34	3.92	326,000
(Empire of Japan) Korea (Japanese colony) ^{AC}	24,326,000	Included with Japanese military	483,000 to 533,000		483,000 to 533,000	1.99 to 2.19	2.09	NA
Latvia (within 1939 borders) ^{AD}	1,994,500	30,000 (in both Soviet and German Armies)	220,000		250,000	12.5	12.5	NA
Lithuania (within 1939 borders) ^{AE}	2,575,000	25,000 (in both Soviet and German Armies)	345,000		370,000	14.36	14.36	NA
Luxembourg ^{AF}	290,000	2,905 Included with German & Allied military	4,201		7,106	2.45	2.45	NA
(United Kingdom) Malaya & Singapore ^{AG}	5,118,000		100,000		100,000	1.95	1.95	NA
Malta (British) ^{AH}	269,000	Included with U.K.	1,500		1,500	0.55	0.55	NA
Mexico ^{AI}	19,320,000	7	100		100	0.00	0.00	NA
Mongolia ^{AJ}	819,000	300			300	0.04	0.04	NA
(United Kingdom) Nauru (Australian) ^{AK}	3,400		500		500	14.7	14.7	NA
Nepal ^{AL}	6,087,000	Included with British Indian Army						NA
Netherlands ^{AM}	8,729,000	6,700	187,300	16,000	250,000	2.86	2.86	2,860
Newfoundland (British) ^{AN}	320,000	1,100 (included with the U.K. & Canada)	100		1,200	0.3	0.3	(included with the/ U.K. & Canada)
New Zealand ^{AO}	1,629,000	11,700			11,700	0.72	0.72	19,314
Norway ^{AP}	2,945,000	2,000	8,200		10,200	0.35	0.35	364
(Australia) Papua and New Guinea (Australian) ^{AQ}	1,292,000		15,000		15,000	1.16	1.16	NA
Philippines (U.S. Territory) ^{AR}	16,000,303	62,500	164,000 to 1,000,000	336,000	557,000 to 1,411,938	3.48 to 8.82	6.15	NA
Poland (within 1939 borders, including territories annexed by USSR) ^{AS}	34,849,000	240,000	5,620,000 to 5,820,000		5,900,000 to 6,000,000	16.93 to 17.22	17.075	766,606
Portuguese Timor ^{AT}	480,000		40,000 to 70,000		40,000 to 70,000	8.33 to 14.58	11.455	NA
Romania (in postwar 1945 borders) ^{AU}	15,970,000	300,000	200,000		500,000	3.13	3.13	332,769
(Belgium) Ruanda-Urundi (Belgian) ^{AV}	3,800,000			36,000 and 50,000	36,000–50,000	0.09–1.3	0.695	NA
South Africa ^{AW}	10,160,000	11,900			11,900	0.12	0.12	14,363
South Seas Mandate (Japanese Colony) ^{AX}	127,000		10,000		10,000	7.87	7.87	
Soviet Union (within 1946–91 borders including annexed territories) ^{AY}	188,793,000	8,668,000 to 11,400,000	4,500,000 to 10,000,000	8,000,000 to 9,000,000	20,000,000 to 27,000,000	(See table below.) ^{AY4}		14,685,593
Spain ^{AZ}	25,637,000	Included with the German Army	Included with France (See footnote.)					NA
Sweden ^{BA}	6,341,000	100	2,000		2,100	0.03	0.03	NA
Switzerland ^{BB}	4,210,000		100		100	0.00	0.00	NA
Thailand ^{BC}	15,023,000	5,600	2,000		7,600	0.05	0.05	NA
Turkey ^{BD}	17,370,000	200			200	0.00	0.00	NA
United Kingdom ^{BE} including Crown Colonies	47,760,000	383,700	67,200		450,900	0.94	0.94	376,239
United States ^{BF}	131,028,000	407,300 ^{BF1} (250,000 died in the European theater)	12,100 ^{BF2}		419,400	0.32	0.32	671,801
Yugoslavia ^{BG}	15,490,000	300,000 to 446,000	581,000 to 1,400,000		1,027,000 to 1,700,000	6.63 to 10.97	8.8	425,000
Other states and territories ^{BH}	300,000,000							NA
Approx. totals	2,300,000,000	21,000,000 to 25,500,000	29,000,000 to 30,500,000	19,000,000 to 28,000,000	70,000,000 to 85,000,000	3.0 to 3.7	3.35	NA

- Figures are rounded to the nearest hundredth place.
- Military casualties include deaths of regular military forces from combat as well as non-combat causes. Partisan and resistance fighter deaths are included with military losses. The deaths of prisoners of war in captivity and personnel missing in action are also included with military deaths. Whenever possible the details are given in the footnotes.
- The armed forces of the various states are treated as single entities, thus the deaths of Austrians, French and foreign nationals of German ancestry in eastern Europe serving in the Wehrmacht are included with German military losses, whilst Michael Strank, is included in the American, not Czechoslovak, war dead.
  - The bare minimum amount of military deaths from all causes is 21,124,905.
- Civilian war dead are included with the territories where they resided. For example, German Jewish refugees in France who were deported to the death camps are included with French casualties in the published sources on the Holocaust.
- The official casualty statistics published by the governments of the United States, France, and the United Kingdom do not give the details of the national origin, ethnic background, and religion of the losses.
- Civilian casualties include deaths caused by strategic bombing, Holocaust victims, German war crimes, Japanese war crimes, population transfers in the Soviet Union, Allied war crimes, and deaths due to war related famine and disease. The exact breakdown is not always provided in the sources cited.

=== Soviet Union ===
The estimated breakdown for each Soviet republic of total war dead^AY4

Soviet Republic	Population 1940 (within 1946–91 borders)	Military deaths	Civilian deaths due to military activity and crimes against humanity	Civilian deaths due to war related famine and disease	Total	Deaths as % of 1940 population
Armenia	1,320,000	150,000		30,000	180,000	13.6%
Azerbaijan	3,270,000	210,000		90,000	300,000	9.1%
Belarus	9,050,000	620,000	1,360,000	310,000	2,290,000	25.3%
Estonia	1,050,000	30,000	50,000		80,000	7.6%
Georgia	3,610,000	190,000		110,000	300,000	8.3%
Kazakhstan	6,150,000	310,000		350,000	660,000	10.7%
Kyrgyzstan	1,530,000	70,000		50,000	120,000	7.8%
Latvia	1,890,000	30,000	190,000	40,000	260,000	13.7%
Lithuania	2,930,000	25,000	275,000	75,000	375,000	12.7%
Moldova	2,470,000	50,000	75,000	45,000	170,000	6.9%
Russia	110,100,000	6,750,000	4,100,000	3,100,000	13,950,000	12.7%
Tajikistan	1,530,000	50,000		70,000	120,000	7.8%
Turkmenistan	1,300,000	70,000		30,000	100,000	7.7%
Ukraine	41,340,000	1,650,000	3,700,000	1,500,000	6,850,000	16.3%
Uzbekistan	6,550,000	330,000		220,000	550,000	8.4%
Unidentified	–	165,000	130,000		295,000	
Total USSR	194,090,000	10,600,000	10,000,000	6,000,000	26,600,000	13.7%

The source of the figures is Vadim Erlikman. Erlikman, a Russian historian, notes that these figures are his estimates.

- The population listed here of 194.090 million is taken from Soviet-era sources. Recent studies published in Russia put the actual corrected population in 1940 at 192.598 million.
- According to Russian estimates the population in 1939 included 20.268 million in the territories annexed by the USSR from 1939 to 1940: the eastern regions of Poland 12.983 million; Lithuania 2.440 million; Latvia 1.951 million; Estonia 1.122 million; Romanian Bessarabia and Bukovina 3.7 million; less transfers out of (392,000) ethnic Germans deported during the Nazi–Soviet population transfers; the Anders Army (120,000); the First Polish Army (1944–45) (26,000) and Zakerzonia & the Belastok Region (1,392,000) which was returned to Poland in 1945.
- Russian sources estimate post-war population transfers resulted in a net loss of (622,000). The additions were the annexation of the Carpatho-Ukraine 725,000; the Tuvan People's Republic 81,000; the remaining population on South Sakhalin 29,000 and in the Kaliningrad Oblast 5,000; and the deportation of Ukrainians from Poland to the USSR in 1944–47 518,000. The transfers out included the flight and expulsion of Poles from the USSR 1944–47 (1,529,000) and the post-war emigration to the west (451,000) According to Viktor Zemskov, 3/4 of the post-war emigration to the west was of persons who were from the territories annexed in 1939–40.
- Estimates in the west for the population transfers differ. According to Sergei Maksudov, a Russian demographer living in the west, the population of the territories annexed by the USSR was 23 million less the net population transfers out of 3 million persons who emigrated from the USSR including 2,136,000 Poles who left the USSR; 115,000 Polish soldiers of the Anders Army; 392,000 Germans who left in the era of the Nazi-Soviet Pact and 400,000 Jews, Romanians, Germans Czech and Hungarians who emigrated after the war The Polish government-in-exile put the population of the territories of Poland annexed by the Soviet Union at 13.199 million.
- Polish sources put the number of refugees from the territories of Poland annexed by the Soviet Union living in post war Poland at about 2.2 million, about 700,000 more than those listed in the Soviet sources of Poles repatriated. The difference is due to the fact that Poles from the eastern regions who were deported to Germany during the war or had fled Volhynia and Eastern Galicia were not included in the figures of the organized transfers in 1944–47.
- Figures for Belarus, Ukraine and Lithuania include about two million civilian dead that are also listed in Polish sources in the total war dead of Poland. Polish historian Krystyna Kersten estimated losses of about two million in the Polish areas annexed by the Soviet Union. The formal transfer of the territories of Poland annexed by the Soviet Union occurred with the Polish–Soviet border agreement of August 1945.
- According to Erlikman, in addition to the war dead, there were 1,700,000 deaths due to Soviet repression (200,000 executed; 4,500,000 sent to prisons and Gulag of whom 1,200,000 died; 2,200,000 deported of whom 300,000 died).
- American historian Paul Bushkovitch estimates that at least 15 million Russian, Ukrainian, and Belarusian civilians were killed during the war.

=== China ===
Estimates of Chinese deaths in the Second Sino-Japanese War (1937–1945) vary considerably. Historian Rana Mitter cites Odd Arne Westad's estimate of 12 million civilian deaths and 2 million military deaths. Official Chinese figures, by contrast, put total casualties during the war at more than 35 million, including over 20 million deaths.

=== Nazi Germany ===
Human losses of the Third Reich in World War II (included in above figures of total war dead). A detailed description is given in the footnotes for Germany and Austria.^^{S2}
Country	Population 1939	Military deaths	Civilian deaths due to Allied Strategic Bombing	Civilian deaths due to Nazi persecution	Civilian deaths due to Expulsion of Germans	Total deaths	Deaths as % of 1939 population
Austria	6,653,000	250,000 to 261,000	24,000	100,000		370,000	5.56
Germany (within 1937 borders)	69,300,000	3,760,000 to 4,456,000	353,000 (1942 borders) to 410,000	300,000 to 500,000	400,000 to 1,225,000	5,700,000	8.23
Foreign nationals of German ancestry in Eastern Europe	7,423,000	430,000 to 538,000			200,000 to 886,000	738,000 to 1,316,000	9.96 to 17.76
Foreign nationals in Western Europe	215,000	63,000				63,000	29.3
Approx. Totals	83,500,000	4,440,000 to 5,318,000	353,000 to 434,000	400,000 to 600,000	600,000 to 2,111,000	6,900,000 to 7,400,000	8.26 to 8.86

- German sources do not provide figures for Soviet citizens conscripted by Germany. Russian historian Grigoriy Krivosheyev puts the losses of the "Vlasovites, Balts and Muslims etc." in German service at 215,000.

=== United States ===
==== Estimated breakdown for each US state and territory of total war dead ====
This table displays the number of people who are believed to have died in the United States by state and territory. In 1939 when World War 2 began, the Census Bureau estimated the population to be 130,879,718 people (excluding the population of Hawaii and Alaska). This list includes those who died at sea.

USA State	Population 1940	Military deaths	Civilian deaths	Total	Deaths as % of 1940 population
Alabama	2,832,961	5,114		5,114	0.180%
Alaska	72,524	91	10	101	0.139%
Arizona	499,261	1,613		1,613	0.323%
Arkansas	1,949,387	3,814		3,814	0.195%
California	6,907,397	17,022		17,022	0.246%
Colorado	1,123,296	2,697		2,697	0.240%
Connecticut	1,709,242	4,347		4,347	0.254%
Delaware	246,505	579		579	0.234%
District of Columbia	663,091	3,029		3,029	0.456%
Florida	1,897,414	3,540		3,540	0.186%
Georgia	3,123,723	5,701		5,701	0.182%
Hawaii	422,770	689	68	757	0.179%
Idaho	524,873	1,419		1,419	0.270%
Illinois	7,897,241	18,601		18,601	0.235%
Indiana	3,427,796	8,131		8,131	0.237%
Iowa	2,538,268	5,633		5,633	0.221%
Kansas	1,801,028	4,526		4,526	0.251%
Kentucky	2,845,627	6,802		6,802	0.239%
Louisiana	2,363,516	3,964		3,964	0.167%
Maine	847,226	2,156		2,156	0.254%
Maryland	1,821,244	4,375		4,375	0.240%
Massachusetts	4,316,721	10,033		10,033	0.232%
Michigan	5,256,106	12,885		12,885	0.245%
Minnesota	2,792,300	6,462		6,462	0.231%
Mississippi	2,183,796	3,555		3,555	0.162%
Missouri	3,784,664	8,003		8,003	0.211%
Montana	559,456	1,553		1,553	0.277%
Nebraska	1,315,834	2,976		2,976	0.226%
Nevada	110,247	545		545	0.494%
New Hampshire	491,524	1,203		1,203	0.244%
New Jersey	4,160,165	10,372		10,372	0.249%
New Mexico	531,818	2,032		2,349	0.382%
New York	13,479,142	31,215		31,215	0.231%
North Carolina	3,571,623	7,109		7,109	0.199%
North Dakota	641,935	1,626		1,626	0.253%
Ohio	6,907,612	16,828		16,828	0.243%
Oklahoma	2,336,434	5,474		5,474	0.234%
Oregon	1,089,684	2,835	6	2,841	0.260%
Pennsylvania	9,900,180	26,554		26,554	0.268%
Rhode Island	713,346	1,669		1,669	0.233%
South Carolina	1,899,804	3,423		3,423	0.180%
South Dakota	642,961	1,426		1,426	0.221%
Tennessee	2,915,841	6,528		6,528	0.223%
Texas	6,414,824	15,764		15,764	0.245%
Utah	550,310	1,450		1,450	0.263%
Vermont	359,231	874		874	0.243%
Virginia	2,677,773	6,007		6,007	0.224%
Washington	1,736,191	3,941		3,941	0.226%
West Virginia	1,901,974	4,865		4,865	0.255%
Wisconsin	3,137,587	7,038		7,038	0.224%
Wyoming	250,742	652		652	0.260%
Puerto Rico	1,869,255	368		368	0.019%
Panama Canal Zone	51,827	21		21	0.040%
Unidentified			11,072	2,587	
Total US	132,164,569	405,000 to 416,800	11,200 to 15,000	418,500 to 420,000	0.32%

=== Japanese Empire ===
Human losses of the Japanese Empire in World War II (included in above figures of total war dead)
Country	Population (1939)	Military deaths	Civilian deaths due to Allied attacks	Civilian deaths due to Japanese persecution	Total deaths	Deaths as % of 1939 population
Burma and India	393,919,000			250,000 to 1,000,000	1,500,000 to 2,500,000	0.38% to 0.63%
China	200,000,000	455,700		7,500,000	20,000,000	10%
Japan	71,900,000	103,900	330,000 to 900,000		2,600,000 to 3,100,000	3.62% to 4.31%
New Guinea	1,292,000		15,000		15,000	1.16%
Philippines	16,000,303	489,600			500,000	3.06%
Totals	683,111,303	1,049,200	345,000 to 915,000	7,750,000 to 8,500,000	24,615,000 to 26,115,000	3.60% to 3.82%

=== Holocaust deaths ===
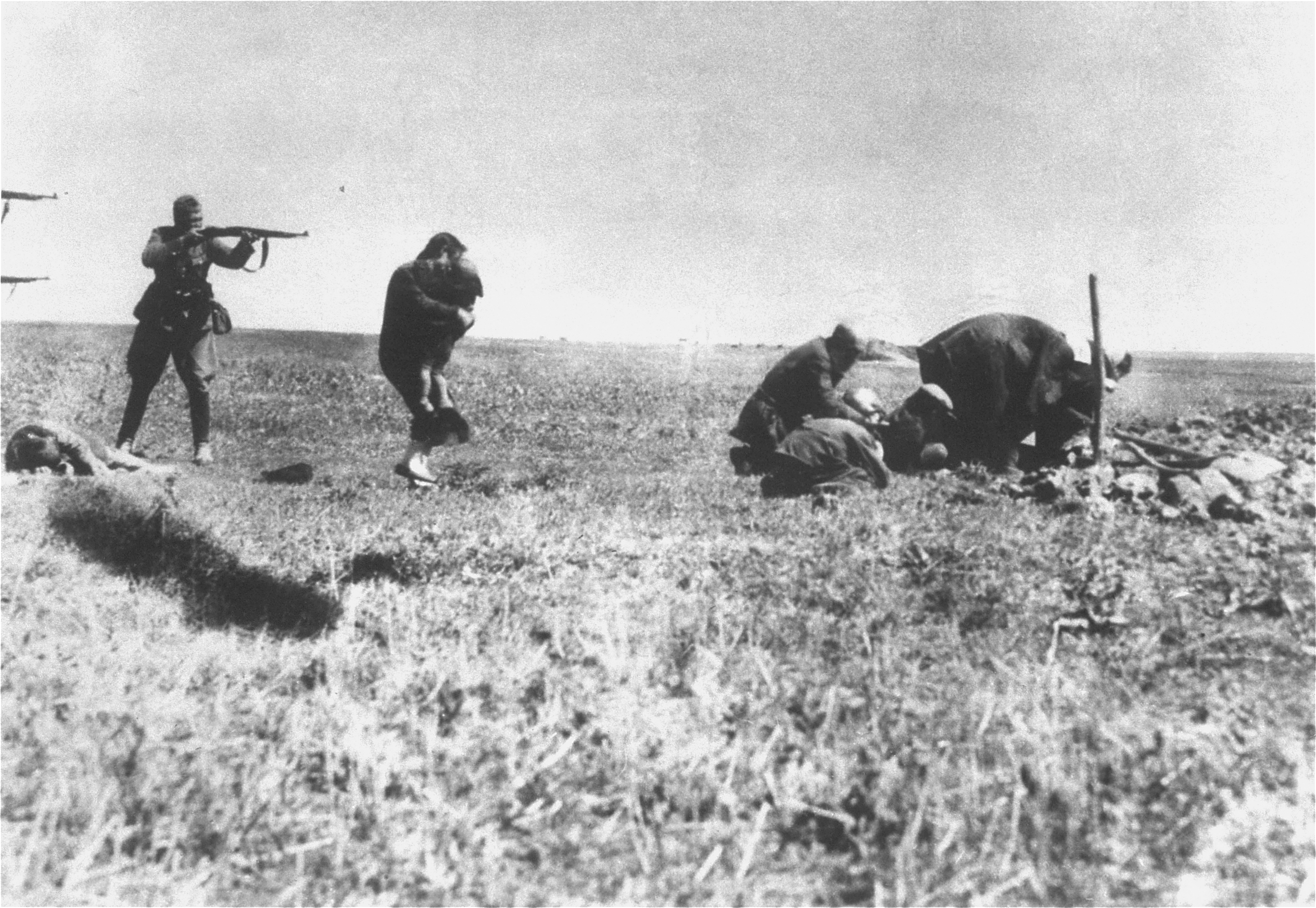
Einsatzgruppen murder Jewish civilians outside Ivanhorod, Ukraine, 1942. Around 6 million Jews were murdered by the Nazis and their collaborators in the Holocaust.

Included in the figures of total war dead for each country are victims of the Holocaust.

==== Jewish deaths ====
The Holocaust is the term generally used to describe the genocide of approximately six million European Jews during World War II. Martin Gilbert estimates 5.7 million (78%) of the 7.3 million Jews in German-occupied Europe were Holocaust victims. Estimates of Holocaust deaths range between 4.9 and 5.9 million Jews.

Statistical breakdown of Jewish dead

- In Nazi extermination camps: according to Polish Institute of National Remembrance (IPN) researchers, 2,830,000 Jews were murdered in the Nazi death camps (500,000 Belzec; 150,000 Sobibor; 850,000 Treblinka; 150,000 Chełmno; 1,100,000 Auschwitz; 80,000 Majdanek). Raul Hilberg puts the Jewish death toll in the death camps, including Romanian Transnistria, at 3.0 million.
- In the USSR by the Einsatzgruppen: Raul Hilberg puts the Jewish death toll in the area of the mobile killing groups at 1.4 million.
- Aggravated deaths in the Ghettos of Nazi-occupied Europe: Raul Hilberg puts the Jewish death toll in the Ghettos at 700,000.
- Yad Vashem estimated that, in early 2019, its Central Database of Shoah Victims' Names contained the names of 4.8 million Jewish Holocaust dead.

The figures for the pre-war Jewish population and deaths in the table below are from The Columbia Guide to the Holocaust. The low, high and average percentage figures for deaths of the pre-war population have been added.

Country	Pre-war Jewish population in 1933	Low estimate deaths	High estimate deaths	Low %	High %	Average %
Austria	191,000 (see footnote)	50,000	65,000	26.2%	34.0%	30.1%
Belgium	60,000 (see footnote)	25,000	29,000	41.7%	48.3%	45.0%
Czech Republic	92,000	77,000	78,300	83.7%	85.1%	84.4%
Denmark	8,000	60	116	0.8%	1.5%	1.1%
Estonia	4,600	1,500	2,000	32.6%	43.5%	38.0%
France	260,000 (see footnote)	75,000	77,000	28.8%	29.6%	29.2%
Germany	566,000 (see footnote)	135,000	142,000	23.9%	25.1%	24.5%
Greece	73,000	59,000	67,000	80.8%	91.8%	86.3%
Hungary (borders 1940)	725,000	502,000	569,000	69.2%	78.5%	73.9%
Italy	48,000	6,500	9,000	13.5%	18.8%	16.1%
Latvia	95,000	70,000	72,000	73.7%	75.8%	74.7%
Lithuania	155,000	130,000	143,000	83.9%	92.3%	88.1%
Luxembourg	3,500	1,000	2,000	28.6%	57.1%	42.9%
Netherlands	140,000 (see footnote)	100,000	105,000	72.8%	74.3%	71.0%
Norway	1,700	800	800	47.1%	47.1%	47.1%
Poland (borders 1939)	3,250,000	2,700,000	3,000,000	83.1%	92.3%	87.7%
Romania (borders 1940)	441,000	121,000	287,000	27.4%	65.1%	46.3%
Slovakia	89,000	60,000	71,000	67.4%	79.8%	73.6%
Soviet Union (borders 1939)	2,825,000	700,000	1,100,000	24.8%	38.9%	31.9%
(Socialist Federal Republic of Yugoslavia) Yugoslavia	68,000	56,000	65,000	82.4%	95.6%	89.0%
Total	9,067,000	4,869,860	5,894,716	50.4% (avg.)	59.7% (avg.)	55.1% (avg.)

- The total population figures from 1933 listed here are taken from The Columbia Guide to the Holocaust. From 1933 to 1939 about 400,000 Jews fled Germany, Austria, and Czechoslovakia. Some of these refugees were in western Europe when Germany occupied these countries in 1940. In 1940 there were 30,000 Jewish refugees in the Netherlands, 12,000 in Belgium, 30,000 in France, 2,000 in Denmark, 5,000 in Italy, and 2,000 in Norway.
- Hungarian Jewish losses of 569,000 presented here include the territories annexed in 1939–41. The number of Holocaust dead in 1938 Hungarian borders were 220,000. According to Martin Gilbert, the Jewish population inside Hungary's 1941 borders was 764,000 (445,000 in the 1938 borders and 319,000 in the annexed territories). Holocaust deaths from inside the 1938 borders was 200,000, not including 20,000 men conscripted as forced labor for the military.
- Netherlands figure listed in the table of 112,000 Jews taken from The Columbia Guide to the Holocaust includes those Jews who were resident in Holland in 1933. By 1940, the Jewish population had increased to 140,000 with the inclusion of 30,000 Jewish refugees. In the Netherlands, 8,000 Jews in mixed marriages were not subject to deportation. However, an article in the Dutch periodical De Groene Amsterdammer maintains that some Jews in mixed marriages were deported before the practice was ended by Hitler.
- Hungarian Jewish Holocaust victims within the 1939 borders were 200,000.
- Romanian Jewish Holocaust victims totalled 469,000 within the 1939 borders, which includes 300,000 in Bessarabia and Bukovina occupied by the USSR in 1940.
- According to Martin Gilbert, Jewish Holocaust victims totaled 8,000 in Italy, and 562 in the Italian colony of Libya.

==== Non-Jews persecuted and killed by Nazi and Nazi-affiliated forces ====
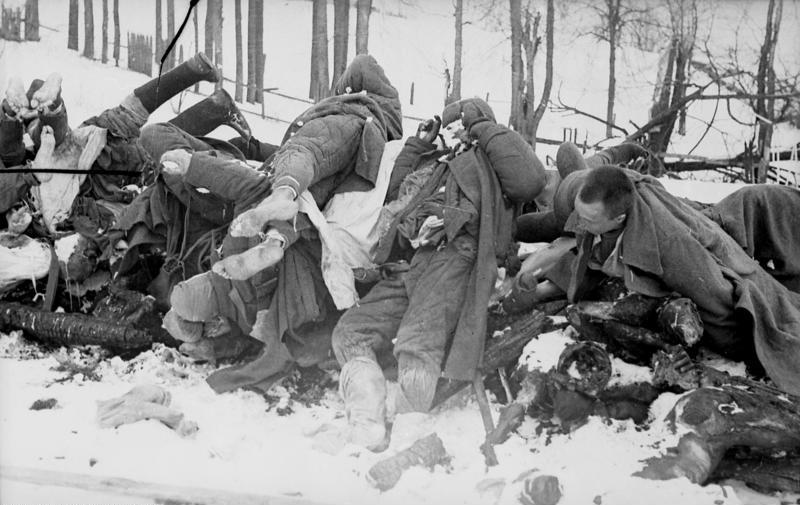
Soviet soldiers killed during the Toropets–Kholm Offensive, January 1942. Officially, roughly 8.6 million Soviet soldiers died in the course of the war, including millions of POWs.

Some scholars maintain that the definition of the Holocaust should also include the other victims persecuted and killed by the Nazis.

- Donald L. Niewyk, professor of history at Southern Methodist University, maintains that the Holocaust can be defined in four ways: first, that it was the genocide of the Jews alone; second, that there were several parallel Holocausts, one for each of the several groups; third, the Holocaust would include Roma and the handicapped along with the Jews; fourth, it would include all racially motivated German crimes, such as the murder of Soviet prisoners of war, Polish and Soviet civilians, as well as political prisoners, religious dissenters, and homosexuals. Using this definition, the total number of Holocaust victims is between 11 million and 17 million people.
- According to the College of Education of the University of South Florida "Approximately 11 million people were killed because of Nazi genocidal policy".
- R.J. Rummel estimated the death toll due to Nazi Democide at 20.9 million persons.
- Timothy Snyder put the number of victims of the Nazis killed as a result of "deliberate policies of mass murder" only, such as executions, deliberate famine and in death camps, at 10.4 million persons including 5.4 million Jews.
- German scholar Hellmuth Auerbach puts the death toll in the Hitler era at 6 million Jews killed in the Holocaust and 7 million other victims of the Nazis.
- Dieter Pohl puts the total number of victims of the Nazi era at between 12 and 14 million persons, including 5.6–5.7 million Jews.
- Roma Included in the figures of total war dead are the Roma victims of the Nazi persecution; some scholars include the Roma deaths with the Holocaust. Most estimates of Roma (Gypsies) victims range from 130,000 to 500,000. Ian Hancock, Director of the Program of Romani Studies and the Romani Archives and Documentation Center at the University of Texas at Austin, has argued in favour of a higher figure of between 500,000 and 1,500,000 Roma dead. Hancock writes that, proportionately, the death toll equaled "and almost certainly exceed[ed], that of Jewish victims". In a 2010 publication, Ian Hancock stated that he agrees with the view that the number of Romanis killed has been underestimated as a result of being grouped with others in Nazi records under headings such as "remainder to be liquidated", "hangers-on" and "partisans".
- In 2018, the United States Holocaust museum had the number of murdered during the time period of the holocaust at 17 million – 6 million Jews and 11 million others.

The following figures are from The Columbia Guide to the Holocaust, the authors maintain that "statistics on Gypsy losses are especially unreliable and controversial. These figures (cited below) are based on necessarily rough estimates".

Country	Pre-war Roma population	Low estimate victims	High estimate victims
Austria	11,200	6,800	8,250
Belgium	600	350	500
Czech Republic	13,000	5,000	6,500
Estonia	1,000	500	1,000
France	40,000	15,150	15,150
Germany	20,000	15,000	15,000
Greece	?	50	50
Hungary	100,000	1,000	28,000
Italy	25,000	1,000	1,000
Latvia	5,000	1,500	2,500
Lithuania	1,000	500	1,000
Luxembourg	200	100	200
Netherlands	500	215	500
Poland	50,000	8,000	35,000
Romania	300,000	19,000	36,000
Slovakia	80,000	400	10,000
Soviet Union (borders 1939)	200,000	30,000	35,000
Yugoslavia	100,000	26,000	90,000
Total	947,500	130,565	285,650

- Handicapped persons: 200,000 to 250,000 handicapped persons were killed. A 2003 report by the German Federal Archive put the total murdered during the Action T4 and Action 14f13 programs at 200,000.
- Prisoners of War: POW deaths in Nazi captivity totalled 3.1 million including 2.6 to 3.0 million Soviet prisoners of war.
- Ethnic Poles: According to the United States Holocaust Memorial Museum "It is estimated that the Germans killed at least 1.9 million non-Jewish Polish civilians during World War II." They maintain that "Documentation remains fragmentary, but today scholars of independent Poland believe that 1.8 to 1.9 million Polish civilians (non-Jews) were victims of German Occupation policies and the war." However, the Polish government affiliated Institute of National Remembrance (IPN) in 2009 estimated 2,770,000 ethnic Polish deaths due to the German occupation (see World War II casualties of Poland).
- Russians, Ukrainians and Belarusians: According to Nazi ideology, Slavs were useless sub-humans. As such, their leaders, the Soviet elite, were to be killed and the remainder of the population enslaved, starved to death, or expelled further eastward. As a result, millions of civilians in the Soviet Union were deliberately killed, starved, or worked to death. Contemporary Russian sources use the terms "genocide" and "premeditated extermination" when referring to civilian losses in the occupied USSR. Civilians killed in reprisals during the Soviet partisan war and wartime-related famine account for a major part of the huge toll. The Cambridge History of Russia puts overall civilian deaths in the Nazi-occupied USSR at 13.7 million persons including 2 million Jews. There were an additional 2.6 million deaths in the interior regions of the Soviet Union. The authors maintain "scope for error in this number is very wide". At least 1 million perished in the wartime GULAG camps or in deportations. Other deaths occurred in the wartime evacuations and due to war related malnutrition and disease in the interior. The authors maintain that both Stalin and Hitler "were both responsible but in different ways for these deaths", and "In short the general picture of Soviet wartime losses suggests a jigsaw puzzle. The general outline is clear: people died in colossal numbers but in many different miserable and terrible circumstances. But individual pieces of the puzzle do not fit well; some overlap and others are yet to be found". Bohdan Wytwycky maintained that civilian losses of 3.0 million Ukrainians and 1.4 million Belarusians "were racially motivated". According to Paul Robert Magocsi, between 1941 and 1945, approximately 3,000,000 Ukrainian and other non-Jewish victims were killed as part of Nazi extermination policies in the territory of modern Ukraine. Dieter Pohl puts the total number of victims of the Nazi policies in the USSR at 500,000 civilians killed in the repression of partisans, 1.0 million victims of the Nazi Hunger Plan, c. 3.0 million Soviet POW and 1.0 million Jews (in pre-war borders). Soviet author Georgiy A. Kumanev put the civilian death toll in the Nazi-occupied USSR at 8.2 million (4.0 million Ukrainians, 2.5 million Belarusians, and 1.7 million Russians). A report published by the Russian Academy of Sciences in 1995 put the death toll due to the German occupation at 13.7 million civilians (including Jews): 7.4 million victims of Nazi genocide and reprisals; 2.2 million persons deported to Germany for forced labor; and 4.1 million famine and disease deaths in occupied territory. Sources published in the Soviet Union were cited to support these figures.
- Homosexuals: According to the United States Holocaust Memorial Museum "Between 1933 and 1945 the police arrested an estimated 100,000 men as homosexuals. Most of the 50,000 men sentenced by the courts spent time in regular prisons, and between 5,000 and 15,000 were interned in concentration camps." They also noted that there are no known statistics for the number of homosexuals who died in the camps.
- Other victims of Nazi persecution: Between 1,000 and 2,000 Roman Catholic clergy, about 1,000 Jehovah's Witnesses, and an unknown number of Freemasons perished in Nazi prisons and camps. "The fate of black people from 1933 to 1945 in Nazi Germany and in German-occupied territories ranged from isolation to persecution, sterilization, medical experimentation, incarceration, brutality, and murder." During the Nazi era Communists, Socialists, Social Democrats, and trade union leaders were victims of Nazi persecution.
- Serbs: The numbers of Serbs murdered by the Ustaše is the subject of debate and estimates vary widely. Yad Vashem estimates over 500,000 murdered, 250,000 expelled and 200,000 forcibly converted to Catholicism. The estimate of the United States Holocaust Memorial Museum is that the Ustaše murdered between 320,000 and 340,000 ethnic Serbs in the Independent State of Croatia between 1941 and 1945, with roughly 45,000 to 52,000 murdered at the Jasenovac concentration camp alone. According to the Wiesenthal Center at least 90,000 Serbs, Jews, Gypsies and anti-fascist Croatians perished at the hands of the Ustashe at the camp at Jasenovac. According to Yugoslav sources published in the Tito era the estimates of the number of Serb victims range from 200,000 to at least 600,000 persons. See also World War II persecution of Serbs.

=== German war crimes ===
During World War II, the German military helped fulfill Nazism's racial, political, and territorial ambitions. Long after the war, a myth persisted claiming the German military (or Wehrmacht) was not involved in the Holocaust and other crimes associated with Nazi genocidal policy. This belief is untrue. The German military participated in many aspects of the Holocaust: in supporting Hitler, in the use of forced labor, and in the mass murder of Jews and other groups targeted by the Nazis.

The military's complicity extended not only to the generals and upper leadership but also to the rank and file. In addition, the war and genocidal policy were inextricably linked. The German army (or Heer) was the most complicit as a result of being on the ground in Germany's eastern campaigns, but all branches participated.

— United States Holocaust Memorial Museum

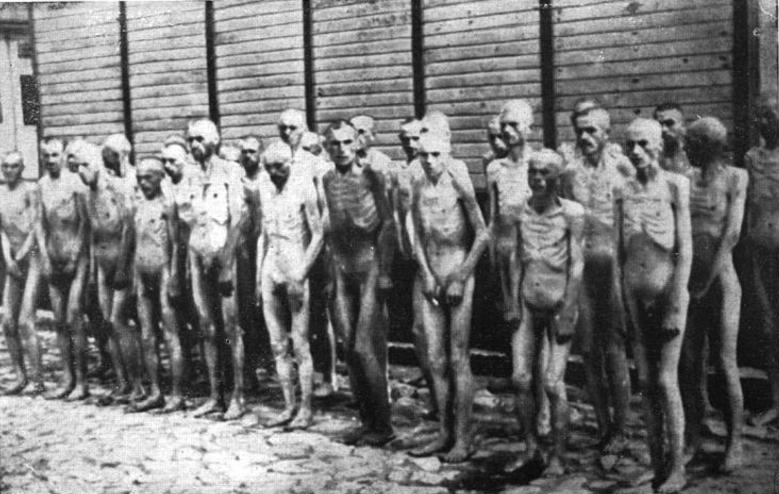
Soviet POWs held by the Nazis in Mauthausen concentration camp. It is estimated that at least 3.3 million Soviet POWs died in German custody.

Nazi Germany ordered, organized and condoned a substantial number of war crimes in World War II. The most notable of these is the Holocaust in which millions of Jews, Poles, and Romani were systematically murdered or died from abuse and mistreatment. Millions also died as a result of other German actions.

While the Nazi Party's own SS forces (in particular the SS-Totenkopfverbände, Einsatzgruppen and Waffen-SS) of Nazi Germany was the organization most responsible for the genocidal killing of the Holocaust, the regular armed forces represented by the Wehrmacht committed war crimes of their own, particularly on the Eastern Front in the war against the Soviet Union.

=== Japanese war crimes ===
Included with total war dead are victims of Japanese war crimes.

==== R. J. Rummel ====
R. J. Rummel estimates the civilian victims of Japanese democide at 5,964,000. Detailed by country:

- China: 3,695,000
- Indochina: 457,000
- Korea: 378,000
- Indonesia: 375,000
- Malaya-Singapore: 283,000
- Philippines: 119,000
- Burma: 60,000
- Pacific Islands: 57,000

Rummel estimates POW deaths in Japanese custody at 539,000. Detailed by country:

- China: 400,000
- French Indochina: 30,000
- Philippines: 27,300
- Netherlands: 25,000
- France: 14,000
- Britain: 13,000
- British Colonies: 11,000
- U.S.: 10,700
- Australia: 8,000

==== Werner Gruhl ====
Werner Gruhl estimates the civilian deaths at 20,365,000.

Detailed by country

- China: 12,392,000
- Indochina: 1,500,000
- Korea: 500,000
- Dutch East Indies: 3,000,000
- Malaya and Singapore: 100,000
- Philippines: 500,000
- Burma: 170,000
- Forced laborers in Southeast Asia: 70,000, 30,000 interned non-Asian civilians
- Timor: 60,000
- Thailand and Pacific Islands: 60,000.

Gruhl estimates POW deaths in Japanese captivity at 331,584.

Detailed by country

- China: 270,000
- Netherlands: 8,500
- Britain: 12,433
- Canada: 273
- Philippines: 20,000
- Australia: 7,412
- New Zealand: 31
- United States: 12,935

Out of 60,000 Indian Army POWs taken at the Fall of Singapore, 11,000 died in captivity. There were 14,657 deaths among the total 130,895 western civilians interned by the Japanese due to famine and disease.

=== Oppression in the Soviet Union ===
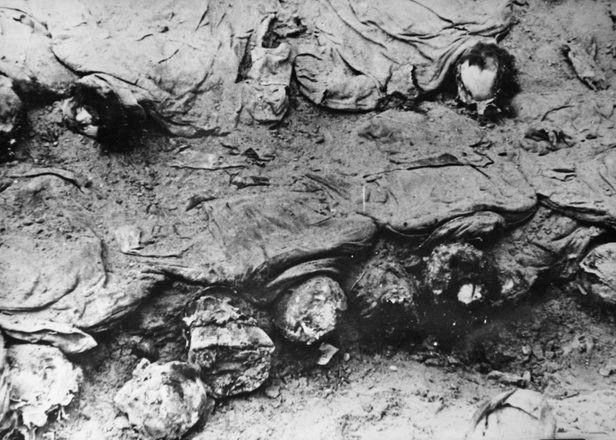
Polish military officers executed by the Soviet NKVD in the Katyn massacre, exhumation photo taken by the Polish Red Cross delegation in 1943

The total war dead in the USSR includes about 1 million victims of Stalin's regime. The number of deaths in the Gulag labor camps increased as a result of wartime overcrowding and food shortages. The Stalin regime deported the entire populations of ethnic minorities considered to be potentially disloyal. Since 1990 Russian scholars have been given access to the Soviet-era archives and have published data on the numbers of people executed and those who died in Gulag labor camps and prisons. The Russian scholar Viktor Zemskov puts the death toll from 1941 to 1945 at about 1 million based on data from the Soviet archives. The Soviet-era archive figures on the Gulag labor camps has been the subject of a vigorous academic debate outside Russia since their publication in 1991. J. Arch Getty and Stephen G. Wheatcroft maintain that Soviet-era figures more accurately detail the victims of the Gulag labor camp system in the Stalin era. Robert Conquest and Steven Rosefielde have disputed the accuracy of the data from the Soviet archives, maintaining that the demographic data and testimonials by survivors of the Gulag labor camps indicate a higher death toll. Rosefielde posits that the release of the Soviet Archive figures is disinformation generated by the modern KGB. Rosefielde maintains that the data from the Soviet archives is incomplete; for example, he pointed out that the figures do not include the 22,000 victims of the Katyn massacre. Rosefielde's demographic analysis puts the number of excess deaths due to Soviet repression at 2,183,000 in 1939–40 and 5,458,000 from 1941 to 1945. Michael Haynes and Rumy Husun accept the figures from the Soviet archives as being an accurate tally of Stalin's victims, they maintain that the demographic data depicts an underdeveloped Soviet economy and the losses in World War Two rather than indicating a higher death toll in the Gulag labor camps.

In August 2009, the Polish Institute of National Remembrance (IPN) researchers estimated 150,000 Polish citizens were killed due to Soviet repression. Since the collapse of the USSR, Polish scholars have been able to do research in the Soviet archives on Polish losses during the Soviet occupation. Andrzej Paczkowski puts the number of Polish deaths at 90,000–100,000 of the 1.0 million persons deported and 30,000 executed by the Soviets. In 2005 Tadeusz Piotrowski estimated the death toll in Soviet hands at 350,000.

The Estonian State Commission for the Examination of Repressive Policies Carried out During the Occupations put civilian deaths due to the Soviet occupation in 1940–1941 at 33,900 including (7,800 deaths) of arrested people, (6,000) deportee deaths, (5,000) evacuee deaths, (1,100) people gone missing and (14,000) conscripted for forced labor. After the reoccupation by the USSR, 5,000 Estonians died in Soviet prisons during 1944–45.

The following is a summary of the data from the Soviet archives:
Reported deaths for the years 1939–1945 1,187,783, including: judicial executions 46,350; deaths in Gulag labor camps 718,804; deaths in labor colonies and prisons 422,629.

Deported to special settlements: (figures are for deportations to Special Settlements only, not including those executed, sent to Gulag labor camps or conscripted into the Soviet Army. Nor do the figures include additional deportations after the war).
Deported from annexed territories 1940–41 380,000 to 390,000 persons, including: Poland 309–312,000; Lithuania 17,500; Latvia 17,000; Estonia 6,000; Moldova 22,842. In August 1941, 243,106 Poles living in the Special Settlements were amnestied and released by the Soviets.
Deported during the War 1941–1945 about 2.3 million persons of Soviet ethnic minorities including: Soviet Germans 1,209,000; Finns 9,000; Karachays 69,000; Kalmyks 92,000; Chechens and Ingush 479,000; Balkars 37,000; Crimean Tatars 191,014; Meskhetian Turks 91,000; Greeks, Bulgarians and Armenians from Crimea 42,000; Ukrainian OUN members 100,000; Poles 30,000.
A total of 2,230,500 persons were living in the settlements in October 1945 and 309,100 deaths were reported in special settlements for the years 1941–1948.

Russian sources list Axis prisoner of war deaths of 580,589 in Soviet captivity based on data in the Soviet archives (Germany 381,067; Hungary 54,755; Romania 54,612; Italy 27,683; Finland 403, and Japan 62,069). However, some western scholars estimate the total at between 1.7 and 2.3 million.

=== Military casualties by branch of service ===
Country	Branch of service	Number served	Killed/Missing	Wounded	Prisoners of war captured	Percent killed
Germany	Army	13,600,000	4,202,000			30.9
Germany	Air Force (including infantry units)	2,500,000	433,000			17.3
Germany	Navy	1,200,000	138,000			11.5
Germany	U-boat (included with Navy)	(40,900)	(28,000)		5,000	68.5
Germany	Waffen SS	900,000	314,000			34.9
Germany	Volkssturm and other Paramilitary Forces		231,000			
Germany	Total (incl. conscripted foreigners)	18,200,000	5,318,000	6,035,000	11,100,000	29.2
Japan	Army (1937–1945)	6,300,000	1,326,076	85,600	30,000	24.2
Japan	Navy (1941–1945)	2,100,000	414,879	8,900	10,000	19.8
Japan	POW dead after surrender		381,000			
Japan	Imperial Japan Total	8,400,000	2,121,955	94,500	40,000	25.3
Italy	Army	3,040,000	246,432			8.1
Italy	Navy	259,082	31,347			12.0
Italy	Air Force	130,000	13,210			10.2
Italy	Partisan forces	80,000 to 250,000	35,828			14 to 44
Italy	RSI forces	520,000	13,021 to 35,000			2.5 to 6.7
Italy	Total Italian Forces	3,430,000	319,207 to 341,000	320,000	1,300,000	9.3 to 9.9
Soviet Union	All branches of service (1939–40)		136,945	205,924		
Soviet Union	All branches of service (1941–45)	34,476,700	8,668,400	14,685,593	4,050,000	25.1
Soviet Union	Conscripted Reservists not yet in active service (see note below)		500,000			
Soviet Union	Civilians in POW camps (see note below)		1,000,000		1,750,000	
Soviet Union	Paramilitary and Soviet partisan units		400,000			
Soviet Union	Total Soviet Forces	34,476,700	10,725,345	14,915,517	5,750,000	31.1
British Empire and Commonwealth	All branches of service	17,843,000	580,497	475,000	318,000	3.3
United States	Army	11,260,000	318,274	565,861	124,079	2.8
United States	Air Force (included with Army)	(3,400,000)	(88,119)	(17,360)		2.5
United States	Navy	4,183,446	62,614	37,778	3,848	1.5
United States	Submarine Service (included with Navy)	~16,000	3,506			21.9
United States	Maritime Service	215,000	9,400	12,000	663	4.5
United States	Marine Corps	669,100	24,511	68,207	2,274	3.7
United States	Coast Guard	241,093	1,917			0.8
United States	Public Health Service Commissioned Corps	2,600	8			0.3
United States	Coast and Geodetic Survey Corps		3			
United States	Total U.S. Armed Forces	16,353,639	407,316	671,846	130,201	2.5

Germany

1. The number killed in action was 2,303,320; died of wounds, disease or accidents 500,165; 11,000 sentenced to death by court martial; 2,007,571 missing in action or unaccounted for after the war; 25,000 suicides; 12,000 unknown; 459,475 confirmed POW deaths, of whom 77,000 were in the custody of the U.S., UK and France; and 363,000 in Soviet custody. POW deaths includes 266,000 in the post-war period after June 1945, primarily in Soviet captivity.
2. Rüdiger Overmans writes "It seems entirely plausible, while not provable, that one half of the 1.5 million missing on the eastern front were killed in action, the other half (700,000) having died in Soviet custody".
3. Soviet sources list the deaths of 474,967 of the 2,652,672 German Armed Forces POW taken in the war.

USSR

1. Estimated total Soviet military war dead in 1941–45 on the Eastern Front (World War II) including missing in action, POWs and Soviet partisans range from 8.6 to 10.6 million. There were an additional 127,000 war dead in 1939–40 during the Winter War with Finland.
2. The official figures for military war dead and missing in 1941–45 are 8,668,400 comprising 6,329,600 combat related deaths, 555,500 non-combat deaths. 500,000 missing in action and 1,103,300 POW dead and another 180,000 liberated POWs who most likely emigrated to other countries. Figures include Navy losses of 154,771. Non-combat deaths include 157,000 sentenced to death by court martial.
3. Casualties in 1939–40 include the following dead and missing: Battle of Khalkhin Gol in 1939 (8,931), Invasion of Poland of 1939 (1,139), Winter War with Finland (1939–40) (126,875).
4. The number of wounded includes 2,576,000 permanently disabled.
5. The official Russian figure for total POW held by the Germans is 4,059,000; the number of Soviet POW who survived the war was 2,016,000, including 180,000 who most likely emigrated to other countries, and an additional 939,700 POW and MIA who were redrafted as territory was liberated. This leaves 1,103,000 POW dead. However, western historians put the number of POW held by the Germans at 5.7 million and about 3 million as dead in captivity (in the official Russian figures 1.1 million are military POW and remaining balance of about 2 million are included with civilian war dead).
6. Conscripted reservists is an estimate of men called up, primarily in 1941, who were killed in battle or died as POWs before being listed on active strength. Soviet and Russian sources classify these losses as civilian deaths.

British Commonwealth

1. Number served: UK and Crown Colonies (5,896,000); India-(British colonial administration) (2,582,000), Australia (993,000); Canada (1,100,000); New Zealand (295,000); South Africa (250,000).
2. Total war related deaths reported by the Commonwealth War Graves Commission: UK and Crown Colonies (383,898); India-(British colonial administration) (87,026), Australia (40,696); Canada (45,388); New Zealand (11,926); South Africa (11,914).
3. Total military dead for the United Kingdom alone (according to preliminary 1945 figures): 264,443. Royal Navy (50,758); British Army (144,079); Royal Air Force (69,606).
4. Wounded: UK and Crown Colonies (284,049); India-(British colonial administration) (64,354), Australia (39,803); Canada (53,174); New Zealand (19,314); South Africa (14,363).
5. Prisoner of war: UK and Crown Colonies (180,488); India-(British colonial administration) (79,481); Australia (26,358); South Africa (14,750); Canada (9,334); New Zealand (8,415).
6. The Debt of Honour Register from the Commonwealth War Graves Commission lists the 1.7m men and women of the Commonwealth forces who died during the two world wars.

U.S.

1. Battle deaths (including Army POWs who died in captivity, does not include those who died of disease and accidents) were 293,121: Army 234,874 (including Army Air Forces 52,173); Navy/Coast Guard 38,257; Marine Corps 19,990 (185,179 deaths occurred in the European/Atlantic theater of operations and 107,903 deaths occurred in Asia/Pacific theater of operations).
2. According to the US Department of Defense, of the 407,300, about 250,000 died in the European theater, the rest died on the Pacific Front.
3. During World War II, 14,059 American POWs died in enemy captivity throughout the war (12,935 held by Japan and 1,124 held by Germany).
4. During World War II, 1.2 million African Americans served in the U.S. Armed Forces and 708 were killed in action. 350,000 American women served in the Armed Forces during World War II and 16 were killed in action. During World War II, 26,000 Japanese-Americans served in the Armed Forces and over 800 were killed in action.

=== Commonwealth military casualties ===
The Commonwealth War Graves Commission (CWGC) Annual Report 2014–2015 is the source of the military dead for the British Empire. The war dead totals listed in the report are based on the research by the CWGC to identify and commemorate Commonwealth war dead. The statistics tabulated by the CWGC are representative of the number of names commemorated for all servicemen/women of the Armed Forces of the Commonwealth and former UK Dependencies, whose death was attributable to their war service. Some auxiliary and civilian organizations are also accorded war grave status if death occurred under certain specified conditions. For the purposes of CWGC the dates of inclusion for Commonwealth War Dead are 3 September 1939 to 31 December 1947.

Military deaths in each year of the war for England and Wales
Year
1939	1940	1941	1942	1943	1944	1945
880	18,952	15,197	34,768	48,584	55,972	69,153

== See also ==
- Allied war crimes during World War II
- Bloodlands
- Equipment losses in World War II
- German casualties in World War II
- World War I casualties
- World War II casualties of Poland
- World War II casualties of the Soviet Union

== Footnotes ==
^A Albania

- No reliable statistics on Albania's wartime losses exist, but the United Nations Relief and Rehabilitation Administration reported about 30,000 Albanian war dead. Albanian official statistics claim somewhat higher losses.
- Jewish Holocaust victims totalled 200, these Jews were Yugoslav citizens resident in Albania. Jews of Albanian origin survived the Holocaust.

^B Australia

- The Australian War Memorial reports 39,648 military deaths. This figure includes all personnel who died from war-related causes during 1939–47.
- According to official statistics Australian battle casualties included 27,073 killed, died of wounds or died as POW; wounded or injured in action were 23,477, these figures exclude non-battle casualties, such as deaths in non operational areas and deaths due to natural causes.
- The Australian government does not regard merchant mariners as military personnel and the 349 Australians killed in action while crewing merchant ships around the world, are included in the total civilian deaths. Other civilian fatalities were due to air raids and attacks on passenger ships.
- The preliminary data for Australian losses included 23,365 killed, 6,030 missing, 39,803 wounded, and 26,363 POWs.

^C Austria

- Military war dead reported by Rüdiger Overmans of 261,000 are included with Germany.
- Austrian civilian casualties were 99,700 victims of Nazi persecution and 24,000 killed in Allied air raids. The Austrian government provides the following information on human losses during the rule of the Nazis. "For Austria the consequences of the Nazi regime and the Second World War were disastrous: During this period 2,700 Austrians had been executed and more than 16,000 citizens murdered in the concentration camps. Some 16,000 Austrians were killed in prison, while over 67,000 Austrian Jews were deported to death camps, only 2,000 of them lived to see the end of the war. In addition, 247,000 Austrians lost their lives serving in the army of the Third Reich or were reported missing, and 24,000 civilians were killed during bombing" raids.

^D Belgium

- Belgian government sources reported 12,000 military war dead which included (8,800 killed, 500 missing in action, 200 executed, 800 resistance movement fighters and 1,800 POWs) and civilian losses of 73,000 which included (32,200 deaths due to military operations, 3,400 executed, 8,500 political deportees, 5,000 workers in Germany and 27,000 Jewish Holocaust victims).
- Losses of about 10,000 in the German Armed Forces are not included in these figures, they are included with German military casualties.

^E Brazil

- The Brazilian Expeditionary Force war dead were 510, Navy losses in the Battle of the Atlantic were 492.
- Civilian losses due to attacks on merchant shipping were 470 merchant mariners and 502 passengers.

^F Bulgaria

- Total Bulgarian military war dead were 18,500 including 6,671 battle deaths.
- There were 3,000 civilian deaths in Allied air raids including 1,400 in the bombing of Sofia.
- A Russian historian in a handbook of human losses in the 20th century has provided the following assessment of Bulgarian casualties:Military deaths: 2,000 military Axis occupation forces in Yugoslavia and Greece; 10,124 dead as allies of the USSR and 10,000 Anti-Fascist Partisan deaths. Regarding partisan and civilian casualties Erlikman notes "According to the official data of the royal government 2,320 were killed and 199 executed. The communists claim that 20–35,000 persons died. In reality, deaths were 10,000, including an unknown number of civilians."

^G Burma

- Military casualties with the pro-Japanese Burma National Army were 400 killed in action, 1,500 other deaths, 715 missing, 2,000 wounded and 800 POW.
- Civilian deaths during the Japanese occupation of Burma totalled 250,000; 110,000 Burmese, plus 100,000 Indian and 40,000 Chinese civilians in Burma.
- Werner Gruhl estimates 70,000 Asian laborers died cruelly during the construction of the Burma Railway.

^H Canada

- The Canadian War Museum puts military losses at 42,000 plus 1,600 Merchant Navy deaths. An additional 700 military dead from Newfoundland are included with the U.K.
- Library and Archives Canada puts military losses at 44,090 (24,525 Army, 17,397 Air Force, 2,168 Navy.)
- The preliminary data for Canadian losses included killed 37,476, missing 1,843, wounded 53,174 and POW 9,045.

^I China Sources for total Chinese war dead are divergent and range from 10 to 20 million as detailed below.

- John W. Dower has noted "So great was the devastation and suffering in China that in the end it is necessary to speak of uncertain "millions" of deaths. Certainly, it is reasonable to think in general terms of approximately 10 million Chinese war dead, a total surpassed only by the Soviet Union." Dower cited a United Nations report from 1947 that put Chinese war dead at 9 million.
- According to Rana Mitter "the death toll on China is still being calculated, but conservative estimates number the dead at 14 million". Rana Mitter cited the estimate of Chinese casualties by Odd Arne Westad of 2 million combat deaths and 12 million civilian deaths, Mitter also cited a Chinese study published in 2006 that put the death toll in the war at 8 to 10 million.
- An academic study of the Chinese population concluded that "a conservative estimate would put total human casualties directly caused by the war of 1937–1945 at between 15,000,000 and 20,000,000". This study cited a Chinese Nationalist source that put total civilian casualties at 2,144,048 =(1,073,496 killed; 237,319 wounded; 71,050 captured by Japanese; 335,934 killed in Japanese air raids; 426,249 wounded in air raids), military casualties at 6,750,000 in 1937–1943 (1,500,000 killed; 3,000,000 wounded; 750,000 missing; 1,500,000 deaths caused by sickness, etc.) In addition 960,000 collaborator forces and 446,736 Communist were killed or wounded.
- The official Chinese government (communist) statistic for China's civilian and military casualties in the Second Sino-Japanese War in 1937–1945 is 20 million dead and 15 million wounded.
- Chinese scholar Bianxiu Yue has published a study of China's population losses in the Second Sino-Japanese War. He put total Chinese losses at 20.6 million dead and 14.2 million injured.
- Official Nationalist Chinese casualty figures were: killed 1,319,958; wounded 1,716,335 and missing 130,126, An academic study of the Chinese population concluded that these figures are "unreasonably low" and "highly suspect".
- R. J. Rummel's estimate of total war dead in 1937–45 is 19,605,000. Military dead: 3,400,000 (including 400,000 POW) Nationalist/Communist, and 432,000 collaborator forces. Civilian war deaths: 3,808,000 killed in fighting and 3,549,000 victims of Japanese war crimes (not including an additional 400,000 POWs). Other deaths: Repression by Chinese Nationalists 5,907,000 (3,081,000 military conscripts who died due to mistreatment and 2,826,000 civilian deaths caused by Nationalist government, including the 1938 Yellow River flood); political repression by Chinese Communists 250,000 and by Warlords 110,000. Additional deaths due to famine were 2,250,000.
- Werner Gruhl estimates China's total war losses at 15,554,000, Civilians :12,392,000 including (8,191,000) due to the Japanese brutality and military dead 3,162,000.

^J Cuba

- Cuba lost 5 merchant ships and 79 merchant mariners died.

^K Czechoslovakia

- According to the Czechoslovak State Statistical Office the population at 1/1/1939 (within post war 1945–1992 borders) was 14,612,000. The population in 1939 included about 3.3 million ethnic Germans that were expelled after the war or were German military casualties during the war.
- Russian demographer Boris Urlanis estimated Czechoslovak war dead of 340,000 persons, 46,000 military and 294,000 civilians.
- A Russian historian in a handbook of human losses in the 20th century has provided the following assessment of Czechoslovak casualties:
  35,000 Military deaths: including: killed during 1938 occupation (171); Czechoslovak Forces with the Western Allies (3,220); Czechoslovak military units on Eastern front (4,570); Slovak Republic Axis forces (7,000); Czechs in German forces (5,000), partisan losses 10,000 and (5,000) POWs.
  320,000 Civilian deaths: (10,000) in bombing and shelling; (22,000) executed; (285,000 in camps including 270,000 Jews, 8,000 Roma); and (3,000) forced laborers in Germany.

^L Denmark

- The Danish Ministry of Education has detailed Denmark's losses in the war of about 8,000 persons including 2,685 killed in Denmark in bombing raids, resistance fighters and those executed by the Germans and 3,000 who died outside Denmark including (2,000 merchant seamen, 63 serving with Allied forces, 600 in German camps, 400 workers in Germany). In addition 2,000 Danish volunteers were killed serving in the German military.

^M Dutch East Indies

- The United Nations reported in 1947 that "about 30,000 Europeans and 300,000 Indonesian internees and forced laborers died during the occupation." They reported, "The total number who were killed by the Japanese, or who died from, hunger, disease and lack of medical attention is estimated at 3,000,000 for Java alone, 1,000,000 for the Outer Islands. Altogether 35,000 of the 240,000 Europeans died; most of them were men of working age."
- John W. Dower cited the 1947 UN report that estimated 4 million famine and forced labor dead during the Japanese occupation of the Dutch East Indies.
- Werner Gruhl estimated the civilian death toll due to the war and Japanese occupation at 3,000,000 Indonesians and 30,000 interned Europeans.
- A discussion of the famine in Java during 1944–45, leads Pierre van der Eng to conclude that 2.4 million Indonesians perished.
- Dutch Military losses in Asia were 2,500 killed in the 1942 Dutch East Indies campaign.
- Data from the Netherlands Institute of War Documentation puts the number of Dutch POW captured by the Japanese at 37,000 of whom 8,500 died.
- The Japanese interned 105,530 Dutch civilians in the East Indies, of whom 13,567 died.

^MA Egypt

- Egyptian military casualties were 1,125 killed and 1,308 wounded. The British used the Egyptian army to guard lines of communication and to clear minefields.

^N Estonia

- Estonia's human losses due to the Soviet and German occupation of Estonia from 1940 to 1945 were approximately 67,000 persons based on a study by Estonian State Commission on Examination of Policies of Repression.
- The first Soviet occupation of Estonia in 1940–41 resulted in 43,900 people dead or missing, including (7,800) arrested persons who were murdered or perished in the Soviet Union; (6,000) deported persons who perished in the Soviet Union; (24,000) mobilized persons who perished in the Soviet Union and (1,100) persons who went missing.
- Losses during the 1941–1944 Occupation of Estonia by Nazi Germany were 23,040, including (7,800) executed by Nazis and (1,040) killed in prison camps. (200) people died in forced labor in Germany. (800) deaths in Soviet bombing raids against Estonian cities, (1,000) killed in Allied air raids on Germany and (1,000) perished at sea while attempting to flee the country in 1944–45. (10,000) Estonians were war dead in the German armed forces and (1,000) surrendered POW were executed by the Soviets. Included in the above figures is the genocide of (243) Roma people and (929) Jews.
- After the reoccupation by the USSR, 16,000 Estonians died in Soviet repressions during 1944–53.
- Total deaths from 1940 to 1953 due to the war and the Soviet occupation were approximately 83,000 persons (7.3% of the population).

^O Ethiopia

- Total military and civilian dead in the East African Campaign were 100,000 including 15,000 native military with Italian forces.
- Small and Singer put the military losses at 5,000.
- The deaths of African soldiers conscripted by Italy are not included with the Italian war dead. The Italian Ministry of Defense estimated 10,000 deaths of native soldiers in East African Campaign.
- These totals do not include losses in the Italian Second Italo-Abyssinian War and Italian occupation from 1935 to 1941. The official Ethiopian government report lists 760,000 deaths due to the war and Italian occupation from 1935 to 1941. However, R.J. Rummel estimates 200,000 Ethiopians and Libyans were killed by the Italians from the 1920s–1941 "based on Discovery TV Cable Channel Program 'Timewatch'", which aired January 17, 1992.

^P Finland

- Military dead include killed and missing from the Winter War and Continuation War with the Soviet Union between 1939 and 1944, as well as action against German forces in the Lapland War 1944–45. Winter War (1939–40) losses were approximately 27,000 military deaths, Continuation War (1941–44) were 66,000, and 1,000 in Lapland War (1944–45).
- The Finnish National Archives website's database lists the names of the 94,676 Finnish war dead between 1939 and 1945. The database includes all servicemen and women who died during being listed in the Finnish army, navy or the air force. It also includes foreign volunteers who died during their service in Finland and Finnish SS-men who died while serving in the German army. The database contains civilians in case they have been buried at a military cemetery. That was sometimes done if the deceased was, for example, an ammunition worker, air raid victim or a civilian worker who for some other reason died because of the war. Some parishes continued burying in the Second World War military cemeteries up to the 1980s.
- Soviet sources list the deaths of 403 of the 2,377 Finnish POW taken in the War.
- 1,407 Finnish volunteers served in the Finnish Volunteer Battalion of the Waffen-SS and 256 were killed in action.
- Civilian war dead were approximately 2,100, due in part to the bombing of Helsinki in World War II.

^Q France

- French military war of 210,000 dead include 150,000 regular forces (1939–40 Battle of France 92,000; 1940–45 on Western Front (World War II) 58,000); 20,000 French resistance fighters and 40,000 POWs in Germany. Civilian losses of 390,000 include: 60,000 killed in allied (mainly American) bombardments, 60,000 in land fighting, 30,000 murdered in executions, 60,000 political deportees, 40,000 workers in Germany, 100,000 victims of Nazi genocide (Jews & Roma) and 40,000 French nationals in the German Armed forces who were conscripted in Alsace-Lorraine.
- The French Ministry of Defense puts French military war dead at 200,000. They note that these losses include combatants from the French colonies as well as metropolitan France; regular soldiers and members of the resistance.
- Vadim Erlikman, a Russian historian, estimates losses of Africans in the French Colonial Forces at about 22,000.
- 752 civilians were killed during the U.S. air attacks on French Tunisia in 1942–43.
- R. J. Rummel estimates the deaths of 20,000 anti-Fascist Spanish refugees resident in France who were deported to Nazi camps, these deaths are included with French civilian casualties.

^R French Indochina

- John W. Dower estimated 1.0 million deaths due to Vietnamese Famine of 1945 during Japanese occupation.
- Werner Gruhl estimates the civilian death toll due to the war and Japanese occupation at 1,500,000.
- Vietnamese sources put the number of deaths during the 1944–45 famine in North Vietnam at between 1 and 2 million.

^S Germany The following notes summarize German casualties. The details are presented in German casualties in World War II.

German population

- The 1939 Population for Germany within 1937 borders File:DR1937.1.png was 69.3 million persons.
- Foreign nationals of German ancestry in the countries of East-Central Europe were subject to conscription by Nazi Germany during the war. According to a 1958 report by the West German Statistisches Bundesamt (Federal Statistical Office) the pre war ethnic German population in eastern Europe was 7,423,300 persons (249,500 Baltic states & Memel; 380,000 Danzig; 1,371,000 Poland (1939 Borders) File:Rzeczpospolita 1923.png - Wikimedia Commons; 3,477,000 Czechoslovakia; 623,000 Hungary; 536,800 Yugoslavia; and 786,000 Romania). These German estimates are disputed. A recent analysis by a Polish scholar found that "Generally speaking, the German estimates... are not only highly arbitrary, but also clearly tendentious in presentation of the German losses". He maintains that the German government figures from 1958 overstated the total number of the ethnic Germans living in Poland prior to war as well as the total civilian deaths due to the post war expulsions.

Total German war dead

- (1949) The West German Statistisches Bundesamt (Federal Statistical Office)estimated total war dead of 5,483,000; (3,250,000)military; (500,000) civilians killed in bombing raids and the land campaign; (1,533,000) deaths in the expulsions from Poland and (200,000) victims of Nazi racial, religious or political persecution. These figures are for Germany in 1937 borders File:DR1937.1.png and do not include Austria or foreign nationals of German ancestry in eastern Europe.
- (1953) The German economist de:Bruno Gleitze from the German Institute for Economic Research estimated total war dead of 6,000,000; (3,100,000) military; (600,000) civilians killed in bombing raids and the land campaign; (800,000) deaths to expulsion from Poland (300,000) victims of Nazi racial, religious or political persecution, (1,200,000) increase in natural deaths due to the war. These figures are for Germany in 1937 borders File:DR1937.1.png and do not include Austria or foreign nationals of German ancestry in eastern Europe.
- (1956) The West German Statistisches Bundesamt (Federal Statistical Office)estimated total war dead of 5,650,000 = (3,760,000) military; (430,000) civilians killed in bombing raids and the land campaign; (1,260,000) deaths to expulsion from Poland and (200,000) victims of Nazi racial, religious or political persecution. These figures are for Germany in 1937 borders File:DR1937.1.png and do not include Austria or foreign nationals of German ancestry in eastern Europe.
- (1961) The West German government issued a statement listing a total of 7,032,800 war dead: (military dead 3,760,000 in prewar 1937 borders File:DR1937.1.png and 432,000 foreign nationals of German ancestry in eastern Europe); (430,000 civilians killed in bombing raids and the land campaign in prewar 1937 borders); (300,000 victims of Nazi racial, religious or political persecution including 170,000 Jews); (expulsion dead 1,224,900 in prewar 1937 borders and 885,900 foreign nationals of German ancestry in eastern Europe). These figures do not include Austria. The Statistisches Jahrbuch für die Bundesrepublik Deutschland 1961, listed Austrian casualties as 250,000 military dead and 24,000 civilians killed in bombing raids
- (1984) A German demographic study estimated 6,900,000 deaths caused by the war in prewar 1937 borders File:DR1937.1.png. (3,800,000) military and (3,100,000) civilians.
- (1991) A German demographic study estimated 5,450,000 to 5,600,000 war dead (4,300,000 military dead; 430,000 civilians killed in bombing raids and the land campaign and 882,000 deaths due to expulsions from Poland). These figures are for Germany in 1937 borders File:DR1937.1.png and do not include Austria or foreign nationals of German ancestry in eastern Europe.
- (1998) A German demographic study estimated 5,500,000 to 6,900,000 war dead. These figures vary because of the shift of borders between 1937 and 1940.
- (2005) The German government issued a report listing total war dead of 7,375,800 (3,100,000 soldiers killed; 1,200,000 soldiers missing; 500,000 civilians killed in bombing raids; 2,251,500 civilian victims of expulsions and deportations; 24,300 Austrian civilians killed and 300,000 victims of Nazi racial, religious or political persecution. These figures include Austria and foreign nationals of German ancestry in eastern Europe.)

German military casualties

- (1945) The casualty figures compiled by the German High Command (OKW) as of January 31, 1945 put total military losses at 2,001,399 dead, 1,902,704 missing and POW held by Allies and 4,429,875 wounded.
- (1946) The Metropolitan Life Insurance Co. estimated German military dead at 3,250,000.
- (1947) The combined staff of the U.K., Canada and the U.S. prepared "A study of the employment of German manpower from 1933–1945". They estimated German casualties up until April 30, 1945, at 2,230,324 dead, 2,870,404 missing and POW held by Allies.
- (1960) The West German government issued figures of the war losses. Total military dead were put at 4,440,000 (3,760,000 in prewar 1937 borders File:DR1937.1.png, 430,000 foreign nationals of German ancestry in eastern Europe and 250,000 Austria).
- (1974) The Maschke Commission found that about 1.2 million German military personnel reported as missing more than likely died as POWs, including 1.1 million in the USSR.
- (1985) The Deutsche Dienststelle (WASt) has been responsible for providing information for the families of those military personnel who were killed or went missing in the war, they do not compile figures of the total war dead. By 1985 they had identified 3.1 million confirmed dead and 1.2 million missing and presumed dead. The Deutsche Dienststelle (WASt) reported the same figures in 2005.
- (1993) The Russian historian Grigoriy Krivosheyev puts the losses of the "Vlasovites, Balts and Muslims etc." in German service at 215,000 According to Krivosheev, 450,600 German POWs died in Soviet captivity (356,700 in camps and 93,900 in transit).
- (2000) Rüdiger Overmans, an associate of the German Armed Forces Military History Research Office, provided a reassessment of German military war dead based on a statistical survey of German military personnel records at the Deutsche Dienststelle (WASt). The Overmans research project was financed by a private foundation and published with the endorsement of the German Armed Forces Military History Research Office of the Federal Ministry of Defense (Germany). The study found that the statistics compiled by German military during the war were incomplete and did not provide an accurate accounting of casualties. The research by Overmans concluded that German military dead and missing were 5,318,000 (4,456,000 in prewar 1937 borders File:DR1937.1.png and 539,000 foreign nationals of German ancestry in eastern Europe, 261,000 Austria and 63,000 foreign nationals from western European nations). The Overmans study did not include Soviet citizens in German service. The details of the Overmans study are presented in German casualties in World War II. In a separate study, Overmans concluded that the actual death toll of German POWs was about 1.1 million men (including 1.0 million in the USSR).

Civilian Casualties

1. ^S2 German civilian casualties are combined from (a) air raid dead, (b) racial, religious and political persecution and (c) casualties due to expulsion of the Germans from east-central Europe:
  (a) Official German and Austrian sources from the 1950s cite 434,000 air raid dead (410,000 in Germany, 24,000 in) Austria The figure cited by Overy (2013) is 353,000 air raid dead.
  (b) The number of victims of Nazi persecution in Germany and Austria (victims of the Nazi euthanasia program) is estimated at close to 400,000 (300,000 in Germany, 100,000 in Austria). According to the German government the euthanasia accounted for an additional 200,000 victims.
  (c) The number of victims of the flight and expulsion of Germans (1944–50) is contentious. Estimates in the 1960s cited a total of 2,111,000 deaths, and the German government as of 2005 still maintained a number of "ca. 2 million". Direct civilian deaths due to the expulsion of Germans is estimated at 600,000 by the German Federal Archive (1974) and at 500,000 to 600,000 by Haar (2009). The substantial difference of close to 1.5 million comprises people whose fate is uncertain in the reported German statistics. The German government maintains that these deaths are due to famine and disease during the flight and expulsion of Germans (1944–50) This was disputed by historian Ingo Haar who maintains that the difference classified as missing is due to a decline in births, the assimilation of ethnic Germans in Eastern Europe after the war, the understatement of military casualties and murdered Jews.

Civilian casualties in air raids

- (1945–47) The United States Strategic Bombing Survey gave three different figures for German air raid deaths.

1- The summary report of September 30, 1945 put total casualties for the entire period of the war at 305,000 killed and 780,000 wounded.
2- The section Effects of Strategic Bombing on the German War Economy of October 31, 1945 put the losses at 375,000 killed and 625,000 wounded.
3- The section The Effect of Bombing on Health and Medical Care in Germany of January 1947 made a preliminary calculated estimate of air raid dead at 422,000. Regarding overall losses, they concluded that "It was further estimated that an additional number, approximately 25% of known deaths in 1944–45, were still unrecovered and unrecorded. With an addition of this estimate of 1944–45 unrecorded deaths, the final estimation gave in round numbers a half a million German civilians killed by Allied aerial attacks."

- (1956) A German government study put German air war dead at 635,000; 500,000 killed by allied strategic bombing and 135,000 refugees killed during the evacuations from eastern Europe in 1945. These figures include 593,000 Germany in 1937 borders File:DR1937.1.png (410,000 civilians, 32,000 foreigners and POW and 23,000 military and Police killed in strategic bombing and 127,000 civilians and 1,000 military and Police refugees fleeing on the eastern front). There were an additional 42,000 dead in Austria and the annexed territories (26,000 civilians, 7,000 foreigners and POW and 1,000 military and Police were killed in strategic bombing and 7,000 refugees fleeing on the eastern front).
- In 2014, Historian Richard Overy published a study of the air war, The Bombers and the Bombed: Allied Air War Over Europe 1940–1945, in which he disputed the official German figures of air war dead. He estimated total air raid deaths at 353,000. Overy maintains that the German estimates are based on incorrect speculations for losses during the last three months of the war when there was a gap in the record keeping system. He points out that the figures for air raid dead in the last three months of the war were estimated in the West German figures from 1956 at 300,000 people which he believes is not plausible. The official figures include an inflated total of 60,000 in the Bombing of Dresden and the inclusion of refugees fleeing westward.

Civilians killed in 1945 military campaign

- The West German government in made a rough estimate in 1956 of 20,000 civilians killed during the 1945 military campaign in current post war German borders, not including the former German territories in Poland. However, there is a more recent estimate of 22,000 civilians killed during the fighting in Berlin only.

Deaths due to Nazi political, racial and religious persecution

- The West German government put the number of Germans killed by the Nazi political, racial and religious persecution at 300,000 (including 170,000 German Jews).
- A 2003 report by the German Federal Archive put the total murdered during the Action T4 Euthanasia program at over 200,000 persons.

Expulsion and flight of ethnic Germans The following notes summarize German expulsion casualties, the details are presented in the Flight and expulsion of Germans (1944–1950), the forced labor of Germans in the Soviet Union' and the Demographic estimates of the flight and expulsion of Germans. The figures for these losses are currently disputed, estimates of the total deaths range from 500,000 to 2,000,000. The death toll attributable to the flight and expulsions was estimated at 2.2 million by the West German government in 1958. German government reports which were released to the public in 1987 and 1989 have caused some historians in Germany to put the actual total at 500,000 to 600,000. English language sources put the death toll at 2 to 3 million based on the West German government statistical analysis of the 1950s.

- (1950) The West German government made a preliminary estimate of 3.0 million civilian deaths in the expulsions.(1.5 million in prewar 1937 Germany File:Oder-neisse.gif and 1.5 million foreign nationals of German ancestry in eastern Europe)
- (1954–1961) The Schieder commission made preliminary estimates the civilian death toll in the expulsions of about 2.3 million persons, broken out as follows: 2,000,000 Poland (in post-war borders) and the Kaliningrad Oblast of Russia; 225,600 Czechoslovakia; 69,000 Yugoslavia; 40,000 Romania; 6,000 Hungary. These preliminary figures were superseded with the publication of the 1958 West German demographic study.
- (1958) A West German government demographic study estimated 2,225,000 civilians died during the flight during the war, post war expulsions and the Forced labor of Germans in the Soviet Union, broken out as follows: Germany in 1937 borders File:Oder-neisse.gif 1,339,000; Poland in 1939 borders File:Rzeczpospolita 1923.png - Wikimedia Commons 185,000; Danzig 83,000; Czechoslovakia 273,000; Yugoslavia 136,000; Romania 101,000; Hungary 57,000; Baltic States 51,000.
- (1965), The search service of the German churches and Red Cross was able to confirm 473,013 civilian deaths in eastern Europe due to the expulsions, broken out as follows: 367,392 Poland (in post war borders); 18,889 Sudetenland; 64,779 Slovakia, Hungary, Romania and Yugoslavia; 9,064 Baltic States; and 12,889 Germans resettled in Poland. There were an additional 1,905,991 unsolved cases of persons reported missing. The results of this survey were kept secret until 1987.
- (1966) The West German Federal Ministry for Expellees, Refugees and War Victims issued a statement that put the number of expulsion dead at 2,111,000 (1,225,000 Germany in 1937 borders File:Oder-neisse.gif and 886,000 foreign nationals of German ancestry in eastern Europe)
- (1974) A study by the German Federal Archive estimated a death toll of 600,000 of civilians in the expulsions and deportations to the USSR. (400,000 in Poland (in post war borders) and the Kaliningrad Oblast of Russia; 130,000 in Czechoslovakia and 80,000 in Yugoslavia.) The authors of the report maintain that these figures cover only those deaths caused by violent acts and deaths in forced labor and internment camps. They also stated that their figures do not include deaths due to malnutrition and disease. This report was kept secret and not published until 1989.
- (1985) A demographic analysis which has the support of the German government, estimated 2,020,000 civilians died during the post war expulsions and the forced labor of Germans in the Soviet Union broken out as follows: (870,000Germany in 1937 borders east of the Oder–Neisse line; 108,000 Germans resettled in Poland during the war; 174,000 Poland in 1939 borders File:Rzeczpospolita 1923.png - Wikimedia Commons; 40,000 Danzig; 220,000 Czechoslovakia; 106,000 Yugoslavia; 75,000 Romania; 84,000 Hungary; 33,000 Baltic States; 310,000 USSR)
- The German government currently maintains that 2.0 million civilians perished in the flight and expulsion from Eastern Europe. In 2006, Christoph Bergner, Secretary of State in Germany's Bureau for Inner Affairs maintained that the figure of 2 million deaths is correct because it includes the deaths from malnutrition and disease of those civilians subject to the expulsions.
- A 2005 report by the German government search service put the death toll at 2,251,500, they did not provide details of the figure The current position in 2015 of the German government Federal Agency for Civic Education is that 2 million civilians perished in the expulsions, they cited as the source for this figure Gerhard Reichling, Die deutschen Vertriebenen in Zahlen.

German government figures of 2.0 to 2.5 million civilian deaths due to expulsions have been disputed by scholars since the publication of the results of the German church search service survey and the report by the German Federal Archive.

- German historian Rüdiger Overmans (2000) published a study of German military casualties; this project did not investigate civilian expulsion deaths. Overmans did, however, provide a critical analysis of the previous studies by German government of the human losses in the expulsions. Overmans maintains that these studies lack adequate support, that a figure of 500,000 expulsion dead is credible, and that there are more arguments for the lower figures rather than the higher figures. He believes that new research is needed to determine the correct balance of the human losses in the expulsions. According to him, the figure of 1.9 million missing persons reported by the search service is unreliable as it includes military dead and persons of dubious German ancestry who were not expelled after the war but remained in eastern Europe, also the figures for expellees living in the GDR was understated.
- In 2006, Historian Ingo Haar controversially disputed the official figures in an article published on 14 November 2006 in the German newspaper Süddeutsche Zeitung. Haar argued for a total of 500,000 to 600,000 victims. Christoph Bergner, Secretary of state in the German Federal Ministry of the Interior, argued in an interview on 29 November against revising the official count of 2.0 to 2.5 million victims, and that the controversy was based on what he maintains is misunderstanding, as he stated that Haar's figures represent the number violent deaths, while the official figures include the much more numerous deaths due to exhaustion, disease and starvation which occurred in the wake of the expulsions and deportations. Haar has published three articles in academic journals during 2006–2009 which covered the background of the research by the West German government on the expulsions. According to Haar the numbers were set too high for postwar political reasons. Haar argues that the government figure of two million is overstated. He maintains the total number of known German deaths east of the Oder–Neisse line and the ethnic Germans in East Central Europe lies between 500,000 and 600,000, including those deported to the Soviet Union. Haar argues that the number reported missing includes a decline in births, persons of dubious German nationality, military deaths and murdered Jews.
- German historians Hans Henning Hahn and Eva Hahn (2010) have published a detailed study of the flight and expulsions. They maintain that figures related to flight and expulsion have been manipulated by the German government due to political pressure. The Hahn's believe the official German figure of 2 million deaths is an historical myth, lacking foundation. They place the ultimate blame for the mass flight and expulsion on the wartime policy of the Nazis in Eastern Europe. The Hahn's maintain that the 473,013 confirmed deaths is a correct accounting of the losses. Most of these losses occurred during the Nazi organized flight and evacuation during the war, and the forced labor of Germans in the Soviet Union; they point out that there are 80,522 confirmed deaths in the postwar internment camps.
- The German Historical Museum puts the number of deaths due to the expulsions at 600,000, they maintain that the figure of 2 million deaths in the previous government studies cannot be supported.
- A joint Czech–German Historical Commission determined that between 15,000 and 30,000 Germans perished in the expulsions. The commission found that the demographic estimates by the German government of 220,000 to 270,000 civilian deaths due to expulsions from Czechoslovakia were based on faulty data. The Commission determined that the demographic estimates by the German government counted as missing 90,000 ethnic Germans assimilated into the Czech population; military deaths were understated and that the 1950 census data used to compute the demographic losses was unreliable.
- Polish historian Bernadetta Nitschke has provided a summary of the research in Poland on German losses due to the flight and resettlement of the Germans from Poland, not including other eastern European countries. Nitschke contrasted the estimate of 1.6 million deaths in Poland reported by the West German government in the 1950s with the figure of 400,000 (in Poland only) that was disclosed in 1989. According to Nitschke most of the civilian deaths occurred during the flight and evacuation during the war, the deportation to the U.S.S.R. for forced labor, and after the resettlement in the Soviet occupation zone in post war Germany.
- Polish historians Witold Sienkiewicz and Grzegorz Hryciuk believe that between 600,000 and 1.2 million German civilians perished during the wartime evacuations. The main causes of death were cold, stress, and bombing. According to Sienkiewicz and Hryciuk between 200,000 and 250,000 persons were held in postwar Polish internment camps and between 15,000 and 60,000 perished.

Post war increase in natural deaths

- German government figures of war losses do not include the increase in natural deaths with war casualties. The German economist Bruno Gleitze from the German Institute for Economic Research estimated that there were 1,200,000 excess deaths caused by the harsh conditions in Germany during and after the war. Gleitze estimated 400,000 excess deaths during the war and 800,000 in post war Germany The West German Statistisches Bundesamt put the actual deaths in 1939–46 due to natural causes at 7,130,000 persons, the demographic study by Peter Marschalck estimated the expected deaths in peacetime due to natural causes of 5,900,000 persons, a difference of 1,230,000 excess deaths. In Allied-occupied Germany the shortage of food was an acute problem in 1946–47. The average kilocalorie intake per day was only 1,600 to 1,800, an amount insufficient for long-term health.

^T Greece

- The Greek government is planning to claim reparations from Germany for war damages.
- The Greek National Council for Reparations from Germany reports the following casualties during the Axis occupation of Greece during World War II. Military dead 35,077, including: 13,327 killed in the Greco-Italian War of 1940–41; 1,100 with the Greek Armed Forces in the Middle East, and 20,650 partisan deaths. Civilian deaths 171,845, including: 56,225 executed by Axis forces; 105,000 dead in German concentration camps (including Jews); 7,120 deaths due to bombing; 3,500 merchant marine dead; 600,000 Famine deaths during the war.
- A study published by Cambridge University Press in 2010 estimated that Greece suffered approximately 300,000 deaths during the Axis occupation as a result of famine and malnutrition.
- Gregory Frumkin, who was throughout its existence editor of the Statistical Year-Book of the League of Nations gave the following assessment of Greek losses in the war. He points out that "the data on Greek war losses are frequently divergent and even inconsistent". His estimates for Greek losses are as follows: the war dead included 20,000 military deaths in the Greco-Italian War of 1940–41, 60,000 non-Jewish civilians, 20,000 non-Jewish deportees, 60,000 Jews and 140,000 famine deaths during the Axis occupation of Greece during World War II.
- In campaigns against the Greek Resistance the German occupiers engaged in a policy of reprisals against civilians, the most notorious were the Distomo massacre and the Massacre of Kalavryta. According to the German historian Dieter Pohl at least 25,000 but perhaps even more civilians were killed in mass executions. Pohl maintains that about 1 million persons (14% of the population) were displaced in the campaigns against the Greek Resistance because their homes were destroyed or they were expelled and became refugees.

^TA Guam

- Guam was a United States administered territory during World War Two. The local Chamorro people were granted U.S. citizenship in the Guam Organic Act of 1950.
- According to an official U.S. report during the Battle of Guam on December 8–10, 4 Guam local military personnel and 3 Guam residents were killed in the battle. However, Japanese sources reported 40–50 of the local population killed.
- Between 1,000 to 2,000 Chamorro people were killed or otherwise died of abuse and mistreatment during the Japanese occupation of Guam from December 10, 1941, until August 10, 1944, including an estimated 600 civilians who were massacred by the Japanese during the Battle of Guam (1944).

^U Hungary

- Tamás Stark of the Hungarian Academy of Sciences has provided the following assessment of Hungarian losses.
  Military losses were 300,000 to 310,000 including 110–120,000 killed in action and 200,000 in Soviet POW and labor camps and 20,000–25,000 Jews in Hungarian military labor service. About 200,000 were from Hungary in the 1938 borders and 100,000 men who were conscripted from the annexed territories of Greater Hungary in Slovakia, Romania and Yugoslavia.
  Civilian dead within the borders of present-day Hungary included 220,000 Hungarian Jews killed in the Holocaust and 44,000 deaths from military operations The Jewish population of Hungary in the 1941 borders was 764,000 (445,000 in the 1938 borders and 319,000 in the annexed territories). Holocaust deaths in the 1938 borders was 200,000 not including 20,000 men conscripted as forced labor for the military. During the Soviet occupation of Hungary, about 700,000 men were deported to Soviet Union, only 300,000 returned to Hungary.

^V Iceland

- Confirmed losses of civilian sailors due to German attacks and mines.

^W India

- India, which was a British colony during World War II, included the present-day India, Pakistan and Bangladesh. India under British administration is sometimes referred to as the British Raj.
- The war dead of 87,029 listed here are those reported by the Commonwealth War Graves Commission.
- Gurkhas recruited from Nepal fought with the British Indian Army during the Second World War. Gurkha casualties with the British Indian Army can be broken down as: 8,985 killed or missing and 23,655 wounded.
- The preliminary 1945 data for Indian losses was, killed 24,338, missing 11,754, wounded 64,354 and POW 79,489. Out of 60,000 Indian Army POWs taken at the Fall of Singapore, 11,000 died in captivity.
- The pro-Japanese Indian National Army lost 2,615 dead and missing.

Bengal famine of 1943

- Cormac Ó Gráda (2007): "[E]stimates of mortality in [the Bengal famine of 1943] range from 0.8 million to 3.8 million; today the scholarly consensus is about 2.1 million (Hall-Matthews 2005; Sen 1981; Maharatna 1996)."
- John W. Dower estimated 1.5 million civilian deaths in the Bengal famine of 1943.
- Amartya Sen currently the Lamont University Professor at Harvard University has recently estimated that a figure of 2.0 to 2.5 million fatalities may be more accurate.

^Y Iraq

- Losses during Anglo-Iraqi War and UK occupation in 1941.
- According to the United States Holocaust Memorial Museum, 150–180 Jews were killed in the Farhud pogrom in 1941.

^Z Ireland

- Although neutral, an estimated 70,000 of the Irish Free State's citizens volunteered in the British military service. Some 40 Irish citizens were killed by accidental bombings in Dublin and Carlow, and 33 Irish merchant seamen were killed in U-boat attacks by Germany. The Irish Free State (Eire) being part of the British Commonwealth during the war, the Commonwealth War Graves Commission records 54 named civilians who died within its borders from effects of enemy action.

^AA Italy

- The Italian government issued an accounting of the war dead in 1957, they broke out the losses before and after the Armistice with Italy: military dead and missing 291,376 (204,376 pre-armistice and 87,030 post armistice). Civilian dead and missing at 153,147 (123,119 post armistice) including in air raids 61,432 (42,613 post armistice). A brief summary of data from this report can be found online.

Military war dead
Confirmed dead were 159,957 (92,767 pre-armistice, 67,090 post armistice)
Missing and presumed dead(including POWs) were 131,419 (111,579 pre-armistice, 19,840 post armistice)
Losses by branch of service: Army 201,405; Navy 22,034; Air Force 9,096; Colonial Forces 354; Chaplains 91; Fascist militia
10,066; Paramilitary 3,252; not indicated 45,078.
Military Losses by theatre of war: Italy 74,725 (37,573 post armistice); France 2,060 (1,039 post armistice);
Germany 25,430 (24,020 post armistice); Greece, Albania, and Yugoslavia 49,459 (10,090 post armistice);
USSR 82,079 (3,522 post armistice); Africa 22,341 (1,565 post armistice), at sea 28,438 (5,526 post armistice);
other and unknown 6,844 (3,695 post armistice).

- Military losses in Italy after the September 1943 Armistice with Italy, included 5,927 with the Allies, 17,488 Italian resistance movement fighters in Italy and 13,000 RSI Italian Social Republic Fascist forces.
- Included in the losses are 64,000 victims of Nazi reprisals and genocide including 30,000 POWs and 8,500 Jews.
- According to Martin Gilbert, Jewish Holocaust victims totaled 8,000 in Italy and 562 in the Italian colony of Libya
- Updated studies (2010) by the Ufficio dell'Albo d'Oro of the Italian Ministry of Defence, p. 4 Archived 2020-08-02 at the Wayback Machine have revised the military deaths to 319,207, of which 246,432 belonged to the Army, 31,347 to the Navy, 13,210 to the Air Force, 15,197 to the Partisan formations and 13,021 to the armed forces of the Italian Social Republic. The casualties recorded for Italy do not include Italians who were born in Italian colonies and possessions (ethnic Italians in Libya, Eritrea, Ethiopia, Somalia and the Dodecanese) and in national territories that Italy lost with the Paris peace treaty of 1947 (mainly the Julian March, Istria and Zara/Zadar; a large part of the victims of the Foibe massacres are thus not included). Also Africans conscripted by Italy are not included in their figures.
- With regards to the Partisan casualties, a ministerial study published in 1955 listed the partisans killed or executed as 35,828; however, the Ufficio dell'Albo d'Oro only considered as partisans the members of the Resistance who were civilians before joining the partisans, whereas partisans who were formerly members of the Italian armed forces (more than half those killed) were considered as members of their armed force of origin.
- With regards to the Italian Social Republic casualties, the Ufficio dell'Albo d'Oro excludes from its lists of the fallen the individuals who committed war crimes. In the context of the RSI, where numerous war crimes were committed in the anti-partisan warfare, and many individuals were therefore involved in such crimes (especially GNR and Black Brigades personnel), this influences negatively the casualty count, under a statistical point of view. The "RSI Historical Foundation" (Fondazione RSI Istituto Storico) has drafted a list that lists the names of some 35,000 RSI military personnel killed in action or executed during and immediately after World War II (including the "revenge killings" that occurred at the end of the hostilities and in their immediate aftermath), including some 13,500 members of the Guardia Nazionale Repubblicana and Milizia Difesa Territoriale, 6,200 members of the Black Brigades, 2,800 Aeronautica Nazionale Repubblicana personnel, 1,000 Marina Nazionale Repubblicana personnel, 1,900 X MAS personnel, 800 soldiers of the "Monterosa" Division, 470 soldiers of the "Italia" Division, 1,500 soldiers of the "San Marco" Division, 300 soldiers of the "Littorio" Division, 350 soldiers of the "Tagliamento" Alpini Regiment, 730 soldiers of the 3rd and 8th Bersaglieri regiments, 4,000 troops of miscellaneous units of the Esercito Nazionale Repubblicano (excluding the above-mentioned Divisions and Alpini and Bersaglieri Regiments), 300 members of the Legione Autonoma Mobile "Ettore Muti", 200 members of the Raggruppamento Anti Partigiani, 550 members of the Italian SS, and 170 members of the Cacciatori degli Appennini Regiment.
- This would bring the total number of Italian military personnel killed to some 341,000 (excluding colonial troops).
- According to the official history of the Italian Army (Rovighi, Alberto (1988), Le Operazioni in Africa Orientale: (giugno 1940 – novembre 1941) [Operations in East Africa: (June 1940 – November 1941)], Rome, Stato Maggiore Esercito, Ufficio storico) From June 1940 to 16 April 1941, 11,755 askaris were killed in Italian East Africa, excluding the losses in Giuba region and eastern fronts. After that date, in the last battles in East Africa there were 490 askaris killed in the battle of Culqualber and 3,700 killed in the battle of Gondar, plus an unknown number in the battle of Amba Alagi and other minor clashes. This would mean that the number of askaris killed in East Africa was likely somewhere between 16,000 and 20,000. According to the Italian Army official history (USSME, La prima offensiva Britannica in Africa Settentrionale, tomo I, allegato 32 (page 375)), the two Libyan colonial divisions lost 1,399 soldiers killed (not counting the officers, who were Italian) in the battle of Sidi Barrani, where they were both destroyed. There was not much use of colonial troops in North Africa afterwards.

^AB Japan

- Estimates for total Japanese war dead in 1937–1945 range from at least 2.5 million to 3.237 million.
- According to the Japanese Ministry of Health and Welfare Japanese war dead (1937–45) totaled 3.1 million persons including 2.3 million soldiers and Army/Navy civilian employees, 500,000 civilians in Japan and 300,000 civilians living outside of Japan. These figures include military dead of 30,000 Taiwanese and 22,182 Koreans.
- Japanese historian Eiji Takamae estimated that between 300,000 to 500,000 Japanese nationals died or disappeared while in Soviet captivity in the years following August 1945. Similarly, historian John W. Dower reported in Embracing Defeat that the Soviets captured between 1.6 and 1.7 million Japanese nationals in Manchuria and North Korea. Of these, 1.2 million were eventually repatriated, suggesting that as many as 400,000 to 500,000 may have died in captivity.

Military dead

- According to a report compiled by the Relief Bureau of the Japanese Ministry of Health and Welfare in March 1964, combined Japanese Army and Navy deaths during the war (1937–45) numbered approximately 2,121,000; broken down as follows:

Key: Location, Army dead, Navy dead, (Total dead)
Japan Proper: 58,100, 45,800, (103,900)
Bonin Islands: 2,700, 12,500, (15,200)
Okinawa: 67,900, 21,500, (89,400)
Formosa (Taiwan): 28,500, 10,600, (39,100)
Korea: 19,600, 6,900, (26,500)
Sakhalin, the Aleutian, and Kuril Islands: 8,200, 3,200, (11,400)
Manchuria: 45,900, 800, (46,700)
China (inc. Hong Kong): 435,600, 20,100, (455,700)
Siberia: 52,300, 400, (52,700)
Central Pacific: 95,800, 151,400, (247,200)
Philippines: 377,500, 121,100, (498,600)
French Indochina: 7,900, 4,500, (12,400)
Thailand: 6,900, 100, (7,000)
Burma (inc. India): 163,000, 1,500, (164,500)
Malaya & Singapore: 8,500, 2,900, (11,400)
Andaman & Nicobar Islands: 900, 1,500, (2,400)
Sumatra: 2,700, 500, (3,200)
Java: 2,700, 3,800, (6,500)
Lesser Sundas: 51,800, 1,200, (53,000)
Borneo: 11,300, 6,700, (18,000)
Celebes: 1,500, 4,000, (5,500)
Moluccas: 2,600, 1,800, (4,400)
New Guinea: 112,400, 15,200, (127,600)
Bismarck Archipelago: 19,700, 10,800, (30,500)
Solomon Islands: 63,200, 25,000, (88,200)
Total: 1,647,200, 473,800, (2,121,000)

Overall, perhaps two thirds of all Japanese military dead came not from combat, but from starvation and disease. In some cases this figure was potentially even higher, up to 80% in the Philippines and a staggering 97% in New Guinea.

- According to John W. Dower, the Japanese source Showa Shi – 1959 by Shigeki Toyama put Japanese war dead in 1937–1941 in the Second Sino-Japanese War at 185,467.
- Approximately 223,000 Japanese civilians residing in the Soviet-occupied zones died, most of them within a year and a half after August 9, 1945.
- In 1949 the report of the Japanese government Economic Stabilization Board put military war dead from December 1941 to December 21, 1946, at 1,555,308 Killed and 309,402 wounded. These figures do not include an additional 240,000 missing Army personnel. The figures of wounded show only those receiving pensions. The details of these figures are as follows:

Army
China after Pearl Harbor 202,958 killed and 88,920 wounded.
vs. United States 485,717 killed and 34,679 wounded.
vs. U.K. and Netherlands 208,026 killed and 139,225 wounded.
vs. Australia 199,511 killed and 15,000 wounded.
French Indochina 2,803 killed and 6,000 wounded.
Manchuria & USSR 7,483 killed and 4,641 wounded.
other overseas 23,388 killed and 0 wounded.
Japan proper 10,543 killed and 6,782 wounded.
Army total 1,140,429 killed and 295,247 wounded.
Navy
Sailors 300,386 killed and 12,275 wounded and missing.
Civilians in Navy service 114,493 killed and 1,880 wounded and missing.
Navy total 414,879 killed and 14,155 wounded and missing.

- The Japanese Central Liaison Office reported in July 1947 to the Allied occupation authorities that Japanese military dead in 1935–1945 were 1,687,738 (1,340,700 Army and 347,038 Navy.)
- The Yasukuni Shrine in Japan lists a total of 191,250 war dead from 1937 to 1941 in the Second Sino-Japanese War and 2,133,915 in the Pacific War Their figures include civilians who participated in combat and Taiwanese and Koreans in the Japanese Armed Forces.
- According to the calculations of Werner Gruhl, Japanese military war dead were 2,565,878 (250,000 from 1931 to 1941 and 2,315,878 in 1942–45).
- John W. Dower maintains that "only one third of the military deaths occurred in actual combat, the majority being caused by illness and starvation". According to Dower over 300,000 Japanese POW were missing after being captured by the Soviets. Japanese figures as of 12/31/1948 listed 469,074 missing personnel in Soviet hands, while at the same time the Soviets admitted to holding 95,000 Japanese prisoners thus leaving 374,041 surrendered Japanese personnel who were unaccounted for and presumed dead. According to Dower "Known deaths of Japanese troops awaiting repatriation in Allied(non-Soviet) hands were listed as 81,090 by U.S. authorities.
- The Japanese Ministry of Welfare and Foreign Office reported from 1951 to 1960 that 254,000 military personnel and civilians were confirmed dead and 95,000 went missing in Soviet hands after the war. The details of these losses are as follows: 199,000 in Manchurian transit camps, 36,000 in North Korea, 9,000 on Sakhalin and 103,000 in the USSR.
- According to the Japanese Ministry of Health and Welfare 65,000 soldiers and civilians were killed in the 1945 military campaign against the Soviet Union. After the war ended deaths at the hands of the Red Army and local Chinese population were 185,000 Manchuria, 28,000 in North Korea and 10,000 on Sakhalin and the Kurile islands. An additional 700,000 were taken prisoner by the Soviets were 50,000 died in forced labor in the USSR and Outer Mongolia.
- The Japanese government figures for POW deaths are not in agreement with Soviet figures. Russian sources report that the Soviets reported the POW deaths of 62,105 (61,855 Japanese and 214 collaborator forces) out of the 640,105 captured (609,448 Japanese and 30,657 collaborator forces).

Civilian Dead

- The 1949 report of the Japanese government Economic Stabilization Board detailed the casualties caused by air raids and sea bombardment. Total casualties were 668,315 including 299,485 dead, 24,010 missing and 344,820 injured. These figures include the casualties in Tokyo (東京) 97,031 dead, 6,034 missing and 113,923 injured; in Hiroshima (広島) 86,141 dead, 14,394 missing and 46,672 injured, in Nagasaki (長崎) 26,238 dead, 1,947 missing and 41,113 injured. According to John W. Dower, an error which appears in English language sources puts the total killed in air raids at 668,000, a figure which includes dead, missing and injured.
- A Japanese academic study published in 1979 by The Committee for the Compilation of Materials on Damage Caused by the Atomic Bombs in Hiroshima and Nagasaki puts the total dead in the atomic attacks at 140,000 (± 10,000) in Hiroshima and 70,000 (± 10,000) in Nagasaki. According to the authors of the report a study of atomic bomb related casualties in Hiroshima in December 1945 was "lost and not discovered until twenty years later", they cited a similar survey in Nagasaki done in December 1945. The authors maintain that the lower casualty figures published in the immediate post war era did not include military personnel and missing persons. The figures of dead in the atomic attacks from this study were cited by John W. Dower in his War Without Mercy.
- According to the World Nuclear Association, "In Hiroshima, of a resident civilian population of 250,000 it was estimated that 45,000 died on the first day and a further 19,000 during the subsequent four months. In Nagasaki, out of a population of 174,000, 22,000 died on the first day and another 17,000 within four months. Unrecorded deaths of military personnel and foreign workers may have added considerably to these figures. About 15 square kilometers (over 50%) of the two cities was destroyed. It is impossible to estimate the proportion of these 103,000 deaths, or of the further deaths in military personnel, which were due to radiation exposure rather than to the very high temperatures and blast pressures caused by the explosions." They noted that "To the 103,000 deaths from the blast or acute radiation exposure at Hiroshima and Nagasaki have since been added those due to radiation-induced cancers, which amounted to some 400 within 30 years, and which may ultimately reach about 550. (Some 93,000 exposed survivors were still being monitored 50 years later.)"
- The Radiation Effects Research Foundation puts the number of deaths (within two to four months), in Hiroshima at 90,000 to 166,000 persons, and in Nagasaki at 60,000 to 80,000 persons. They noted that deaths caused by the atomic bombings include those that occurred on the days of the bombings due to the overwhelming force and heat of the blasts, as well as later deaths attributable to radiation exposure. The total number of deaths is not known precisely because military personnel records in each city were destroyed; entire families perished, leaving no one to report deaths; and unknown numbers of forced laborers were present in both cities.
- The U.S. Strategic Bombing Survey published the following estimates of Japanese casualties due to U.S. bombing.

1-Summary Report (July 1946) Total civilian casualties in Japan, as a result of 9 months of air attack, including those from the atomic bombs, were approximately 806,000. Of these, approximately 330,000 were fatalities.

2-United States Strategic Bombing Survey, Medical Division (1947) The bombing of Japan killed 333,000 civilians and injured 473,000. Of this total 120,000 died and 160,000 were injured in the atomic bombings, leaving 213,000 dead and 313,000 injured by conventional bombing.

3-The effects of air attack on Japanese urban economy. Summary report (1947) Estimated that 252,769 Japanese were killed and 298,650 injured in the air war.

4-The Effects of strategic bombing on Japanese morale Based on a survey of Japanese households the death toll was put at 900,000 dead and 1.3 million injured, the SBS noted that this figure was subject to a maximum sampling error of 30%.

5-Strategic Bombing Survey The Effects of Atomic Bombs on Hiroshima and Nagasaki The most striking result of the atomic bombs was the great number of casualties. The exact number of dead and injured will never be known because of the confusion after the explosions. Persons unaccounted for might have been burned beyond recognition in the falling buildings, disposed of in one of the mass cremations of the first week of recovery, or driven out of the city to die or recover without any record remaining. No sure count of even the prepaid populations existed. Because of the decline in activity in the two port cities, the constant threat of incendiary raids, and the formal evacuation programs of the Government, an unknown number of the inhabitants had either drifter away from the cities or been removed according to plan. In this uncertain situation, estimates of casualties have generally ranged between 100,000 and 180,000 for Hiroshima, and between 50,000 and 100,000 for Nagasaki. The Survey believes the dead at Hiroshima to have been between 70,000 and 80,000, with an equal number injured; at Nagasaki over 35,000 dead and somewhat more than that injured seems the most plausible estimate.

- John W. Dower puts Japanese civilian dead in Battle of Saipan at 10,000 and 150,000 in Battle of Okinawa based on a recent study of the campaign. However, American military sources put civilian dead on Okinawa at 42,000, they noted that Japanese sources indicate 50,000 Okinawan noncombatants were killed during the campaign.
- War related deaths of Japanese merchant marine personnel were 27,000.

^AC Korea

- American researcher R. J. Rummel estimated 378,000 Korean dead due to forced labor in Japan and Manchuria. According to Rummel, "Information on Korean deaths under Japanese occupation is difficult to uncover. We do know that 5,400,000 Koreans were conscripted for labor beginning in 1939, but how many died can only be roughly estimated."
- Werner Gruhl estimated the civilian death toll due to the war and Japanese occupation at 533,000.
- John W. Dower has noted "Between 1939 and 1945, close to 670,000 Koreans were brought to Japan for fixed terms of work, mostly in mines and heavy industry, and it has been estimated that 60,000 or more of them died under harsh conditions of their work places. Over 10,000 others were probably killed in the atomic bombings of Hiroshima and Nagasaki".

^AD Latvia

- Independent Russian historian Vadim Erlikman estimated Latvian civilian war dead in 1941–45 at 220,000 (35,000 in military operations; 110,000 executed, 35,000 in Germany and 40,000 due to hunger and disease. Military dead were estimated with Soviet forces at 10,000 and 15,000 with German. POW deaths 3,000.)

^AE Lithuania

- Independent Russian historian Vadim Erlikman estimated Lithuanian civilian war dead in 1941–45 at 345,000 (25,000 in military operations; 230,000 executed, 15,000 in Germany and 75,000 due to hunger and disease. Military dead were estimated with Soviet forces at 15,000 and 5,000 with German. POW deaths 4,000.)

^AF Luxembourg

- Total war dead were 5,000 which included military losses of about 3,000 with the German Armed Forces and 200 in a separate unit attached to the Belgian Army.

^AG Malaya and Singapore

- The British colony of Malaya consisted of the Straits Settlements, the Federated Malay States and Unfederated Malay States. Today they are the nations Malaysia and Singapore.
- According to John W. Dower "Malayan officials after the war claimed, possibly with exaggeration, that as many as 100,000 residents, mostly Chinese, may have been killed by the Japanese; of 73,000 Malayans transported to work on the Burma-Siam railway, 25,000 were reported to have died.
- According to Werner Gruhl in Singapore the Japanese murdered 5,000 to 10,000 Chinese in 1942. In Malaya and Singapore an estimated 50,000 Chinese were killed in this genocide by the end of the war

^AH Malta 1,493 civilians were killed and 3,734 wounded during the Siege of Malta (World War II) Maltese civilians killed during the siege are also included with U.K. civilian deaths by the Commonwealth War Graves Commission.

^AI Mexico

- Mexico lost 7 merchant ships and 63 dead merchant mariners. A Mexican Air Force unit Escuadrón 201 served in the Pacific and suffered 7 deaths.

^AJ Mongolia

- Military losses with USSR against Japan in the 1939 Battle of Khalkhin Gol (200) and the 1945 Soviet invasion of Manchuria (72) campaigns.

^AK Nauru

- During World War II Japan occupied Nauru in August 1942 and deported 1,200 Nauruans to work as laborers in the Caroline Islands, where 463 died. The survivors returned to Nauru in January 1946.

^AL Nepal

- Gurkhas recruited from Nepal fought with the British Indian Army and Nepalese Army during the Second World War. The war dead reported by the Commonwealth War Graves Commission for India include Nepalese in the British Indian Army and Nepalese Army.
- Gurkha casualties can be broken down as: 8,985 killed or missing and 23,655 wounded.

^AM Netherlands

- In 1948 the Netherlands Central Bureau of Statistics (CBS) issued a report of war losses. They listed 210,000 direct war casualties in the Netherlands, not including the Dutch East Indies.

Military deaths 6,750 which included 3,900 regular Army, 2,600 Navy forces, and 250 POW in Germany.
Civilian deaths of 203,250 which included 1,350 Merchant seaman, 2,800 executed, 2,500 dead in Dutch concentration camps,
20,400 killed by acts of war, 104,000 Jewish Holocaust dead, 18,000 political prisoners in Germany, 27,000 workers in Germany,
3,700 Dutch nationals in the German armed forces and 7,500 missing and presumed dead in Germany and 16,000 deaths
in the Dutch famine of 1944. Not Included in the figure of 210,000 war dead are 70,000 "indirect war casualties",
which are attributed to an increase in natural deaths from 1940 to 1945 and 1,650 foreign nationals killed while serving in the
Dutch Merchant Marine.

- The Netherlands War Graves Foundation maintains a registry of the names of Dutch war dead.

^AN Newfoundland

- Newfoundland lost 1,089 persons with U.K. and Canadian Forces during the war.
- The losses of the Newfoundland Merchant Navy are commemorated at the Allied Merchant Navy Memorial in Newfoundland,
- Civilian losses were due to the sinking of the SS Caribou in October 1942.

^AO New Zealand

- The Auckland War Museum puts the number of World War II dead at 11,671.
- The preliminary data for New Zealand losses was killed 10,033, missing 2,129, wounded 19,314 and POW 8,453.

^AP Norway

- According to Norwegian government sources the war dead were 10,200.

Military(Norwegian & Allied Forces) 2,000 (800 Army, 900 Navy and 100 Air).
Civilians 7,500 (3,600 Merchant seaman, 1,500 resistance fighters, 1,800 civilians killed and 600 Jews killed)
In German Armed Forces 700

^AQ Papua New Guinea

- Civilian deaths were caused by Allied bombing and shellfire and Japanese atrocities. Both the Allies and Japanese also conscripted civilians to work as laborers and porters.

^AR Philippines

- Philippines military losses were 57,000 including 7,000 KIA in 1941–42 campaign, 8,000 guerrillas KIA 1942–45 and 42,000 POWs(out of 98,000).
- According to Werner Gruhl the death toll due to the war and Japanese occupation at 527,000 (27,000 military dead, 141,000 massacred, 22,500 forced labor deaths and 336,500 deaths due war related famine). Civilian losses included victims of Japanese war crimes, such as the Manila massacre which claimed the lives of 100,000 Filipinos.
- Between 5,000 and 10,000 Filipinos serving with the Filipino troops, Scouts, Constabulary and Philippine Army units lost their lives on the Bataan Death March.

^AS Poland

Total Polish war dead

- In 2009, Wojciech Materski and Tomasz Szarota of the Polish Institute of National Remembrance (IPN) put the figure of Poland's dead at between 5,620,000 and 5,820,000; including an estimated 150,000 Polish citizens who died due to Soviet repression. The IPN's figures include 2.7 to 2.9 million Polish Jews who were murdered in the Holocaust and 2,770,000 ethnic Poles (including "Direct War Losses" −543,000; "Murdered in Camps and in Pacification" −506,000; "Deaths in prisons and Camps" 1,146,000; "Deaths outside of prisons and Camps" 473,000; "Murdered in Eastern Regions" 100,000; "Deaths in other countries" 2,000). Polish researchers have determined that the Nazis murdered 2,830,000 Jews (including 1,860,000 Polish Jews) in the extermination camps in Poland, in addition over 1.0 million Polish Jews were murdered by the Einsatzgruppen in the eastern regions or died of starvation and disease while in ghettos.
- In his 2009 book, Andrzej Leon Sowa of the Jagiellonian University emphasizes the lack of reliable data concerning World War II losses. According to him, between 2.35 and 2.9 million Polish citizens of Jewish ethnicity were killed, in addition to about two million ethnic Poles. He writes that not even estimated figures are available regarding Polish citizens of German, Ukrainian or Belarusian ethnicity.
- The United States Holocaust Memorial Museum states that "[i]t is estimated that the Germans killed between 1.8 and 1.9 million non-Jewish Polish civilians during World War II. In addition, the Germans murdered at least 3 million Jewish citizens of Poland.".
- Czesław Łuczak in 1993 estimated Poland's war dead to be 5.9 to 6.0 million, including 2.9 to 3.0 million Jews murdered in the Holocaust and 2.0 million ethnic Polish victims of the German and Soviet occupations, (1.5 million under German occupation and the balance of 500,000 in the former eastern Polish regions under Soviet occupation). Łuczak also included in his figures an estimated 1,000,000 war dead of Polish citizens from the ethnic Ukrainian and Belarusian ethnic groups who comprised 20% of Poland's pre-war population.
- Tadeusz Piotrowski estimated Poland's losses in World War II to be 5.6 million; including 5,150,000 victims of Nazi crimes against ethnic Poles and The Holocaust, 350,000 deaths during the Soviet occupation in 1940–41 and about 100,000 Poles killed in 1943–44 during the massacres of Poles in Volhynia. Losses by ethnic group were 3,100,000 Jews; 2,000,000 ethnic Poles; 500,000 Ukrainians and Belarusians.
- Total losses by geographic area were about 4.4 million in present-day Poland and about 1.6 million in the Polish areas annexed by the Soviet Union. Polish historian Krystyna Kersten estimated losses of about 2.0 million in the Polish areas annexed by the Soviet Union. Contemporary Russian sources also include Poland's losses in the annexed territories with Soviet war deaths.
- The official Polish government report on war damages prepared in 1947 listed 6,028,000 war victims during the German occupation (including 123,178 military deaths, 2.8 million Poles and 3.2 million Jews), out of a population of 27,007,000 ethnic Poles and Jews; this report excluded ethnic Ukrainian and Belarusian losses. Losses were calculated for the territory of Poland in 1939, including the territories annexed by the USSR. The figure of 6.0 million war dead has been disputed by Polish scholars since the fall of communism who now put the total actual losses at about 3.0 million Jews and 2.0 million ethnic Poles, not including other ethnic groups (Ukrainians and Belarusians). They maintain that the official statistics include those persons who were missing and presumed dead, but actually remained abroad in the West and the USSR after the war.

Polish losses during the Soviet occupation (1939–1941)

- In August 2009, Wojciech Materski and Tomasz Szarota of the Polish Institute of National Remembrance (IPN) estimated that 150,000 Polish citizens were killed due to Soviet repression. Since the collapse of the USSR, Polish scholars have been able to do research in the Soviet archives on Polish losses during the Soviet occupation.
- In his 2009 book, Andrzej Leon Sowa of the Jagiellonian University states that about 325,000 Polish citizens were deported by the Soviets in 1940–41. The number of the deaths for which the Soviets are responsible "probably did not exceed 100,000", and the same applies to the killings perpetrated by Ukrainian nationalists.
- Andrzej Paczkowski puts the number of Polish deaths at 90,000–100,000 of the 1.0 million persons deported and 30,000 executed by the Soviets.
- In 2005 Tadeusz Piotrowski estimated the death toll in Soviet hands at 350,000.
- An earlier estimate made in 1987 by Franciszek Proch of the Polish Association of Former Political Prisoners of Nazi and Soviet Concentration Camps estimated the total dead due to the Soviet occupation at 1,050,000.

Polish military casualties

- Poland lost a total of 139,800 regular soldiers and 100,000 Polish resistance movement fighters during the war. Polish military casualties. Military dead and missing were 66,000 and 130,000 wounded in the 1939 Invasion of Poland, in addition 17,000–19,000 were killed by the Soviets in the Katyn massacre and 12,000 died in German POW camps. The Polish contribution to World War II included the Polish Armed Forces in the West, and the 1st Polish Army fighting under Soviet command. Total casualties of these forces in exile were 33,256 killed in action, 8,548 missing in action, 42,666 wounded and 29,385 interned.
  The Polish Red Cross reported that the 1944 Warsaw Uprising cost the lives of 120,000–130,000 Polish civilians and 16,000–17,000 Polish resistance movement fighters. The names of Polish war dead are presented at a database online.
- During the war, 2,762,000 Polish citizens of German descent declared their loyalty to Germany by signing the Deutsche Volksliste. A West German government report estimated the deaths of 108,000 Polish citizens serving in the German armed forces, these men were conscripted in violation of international law. The Institute of National Remembrance (IPN) estimates 200,000–210,000 Polish citizens, including 76,000 ethnic Poles were conscripted into the Soviet armed forces in 1940–41 during the occupation of the eastern regions. The (IPN) also reported that the Germans conscripted 250,000 Polish nationals into the Wehrmacht, 89,300 later deserted and joined the Polish Armed Forces in the West.

^AT Timor

- Officially neutral, East Timor was occupied by Japan during 1942–45. Allied commandos initiated a guerrilla resistance campaign and most deaths were caused by Japanese reprisals against the civilian population. The Australian Dept. of Defence estimated the civilian death toll at 40,000 to 70,000. However, another source puts the death toll at 40,000 to 50,000.

^AU Romania

- Demographer Boris Urlanis estimated Romanian war dead at 300,000 military and 200,000 civilians.
- Total Romanian military war dead were approximately 300,000. Total killed were 93,326 (72,291 with Axis and 21,035 with Allies). Total missing and POW were 341,765 (283,322 with Axis and 58,443 with Allies), only about 80,000 survived Soviet captivity.
- Civilian losses included 160,000 Jewish Holocaust dead, the genocide of Roma people 36,000 and 7,693 civilians killed in Allied air raids on Romania.

^AV Ruanda Urundi

- The Ruzagayura famine from October 1943 to December 1944 was due to a local drought and the harsh wartime policies of the Belgian colonial administration to increase food production for the war effort in the Congo. By the time the famine ended between 36,000 and 50,000 people died of hunger in the territory. Several hundred thousand people also emigrated away from Ruanda-Urundi, most to the Belgian Congo but also to British Uganda.
- As Ruanda [Rwanda] was not occupied nor its food supply cut off, these deaths are not usually included with World War II casualties. However, at least one historian has compared the 1943 famine there to the Bengal famine of 1943, which is attributed to war.

^AW South Africa

- The war dead of 11,907 listed here are those reported by the Commonwealth War Graves Commission.
- The preliminary 1945 data for South African losses was killed 6,840, missing 1,841 wounded 14,363 and POW 14,589.

^AX South Seas Mandate

- This territory includes areas now known as the Marshall Islands, Micronesia, Palau, and the Northern Mariana Islands.
- Micronesian war related civilian deaths were caused by American bombing and shellfire; and malnutrition caused by the U.S. blockade of the islands. In addition the civilian population was conscripted by the Japanese as forced laborers and were subjected to numerous mindless atrocities.
- John W. Dower put Japanese civilian dead in Battle of Saipan at 10,000.
- ^AY Soviet Union

The following notes summarize Soviet casualties, the details are presented in World War II casualties of the Soviet Union.

- A 1993 report published by the Russian Academy of Science estimated the total Soviet losses in World War II at 26.6 million The Russian Ministry of Defense in 1993 put total military dead and missing in 1941–45 at 8,668,400 These figures have generally been accepted by historians in the west. The total population loss of 26.6 million is an estimate based on a demographic study, it is not an exact accounting of the war dead. The figures of 26.6 million total war dead and 8.668 million military dead are cited by the Russian government for the losses in the war.
- Military war dead The figures for Soviet military war dead and missing are disputed. The official report on the military casualties was prepared by Grigori F. Krivosheev According to Krivosheev, the losses of the Red Army and Navy combat forces in the field were 8,668,400 including 5,226,800 killed in action, 555,500 non-combat deaths, 1,102,800 died of wounds 500,000 missing in action.
  The remaining balance includes 1,103,000 POW dead and 180,000 POWs who remained in western countries at the end of the war. Krivosheev maintains that the higher figure of 3.3 million POW dead cited in western sources is based on German figures and analysis. Krivosheev maintains that these statistics are not correct because they include reservists not on active strength, civilians and military personnel reported missing who were recovered during the course of the war. He maintains that the actual number captured were 4,559,000, he deducted 3,276,000 to arrive at his total of 1.283 million POW irrecoverable losses, his deductions were 500,000 reservists not on actual strength, 939,700 military personnel reported missing who were recovered during the war and 1,836,000 POWs who returned to the Soviet Union at the end of the war.
  Krivosheev's figures are disputed by historians who put the actual losses at between 10.9 and 11.5 million. Critics of Krivosheev maintain that he underestimated the losses of POWs and missing in action and did he did not include the casualties of those convicted. Data published in Russia by Viktor Zemskov put Soviet POW losses at 2,543,000 (5,734,000 were captured, 821,000 released into German service and 2,371,000 liberated). Zemskov estimated the total military war dead were 11.5 million, including POW dead of 2.3 million and 1.5 million missing in action. S. N. Mikhalev estimated total military irrecoverable losses at 10.922 million. A recent study by Christian Hartmann put Soviet military dead at 11.4 million. Additional losses not included by Krivosheev were 267,300 who died of sickness in hospital, 135,000 convicts executed, and 422,700 convicts sent to penal units at the front.
  S. N. Mikhalev estimated total military demographic losses at 13.7 million. S. A. Il'enkov, an official of the Central Archives of the Russian Ministry of Defense, maintained, "We established the number of irreplaceable losses of our Armed Forces at the time of the Great Patriotic War of about 13,850,000." Il'enkov and Mikhalev maintained that the field unit reports did not include deaths in rear area hospitals of wounded personnel and personnel captured in the early months of the war. Additional demographic losses to the Soviet military were those imprisoned for desertion after the war and deserters in German military service. According to Krivosheev, the losses of deserters in German service were 215,000. He listed 436,600 convicts who were imprisoned.
- Civilian war dead The Russian government puts the civilian death toll due to the war at 13,684,000 (7,420,000 killed, 2,164,000 forced labor deaths in Germany and 4,100,000 deaths due to famine and disease). A Russian academic study estimated an additional 2.5 to 3.2 million civilian dead due to famine and disease in Soviet territory not occupied by the Germans. Statistics published in Russia list civilian war losses of 6,074,857 civilians killed reported by the Extraordinary State Commission in 1946, 641,803 famine deaths during the siege of Leningrad according to official figures, 58,000 killed in bombing raids (40,000 Stalingrad,17,000 Leningrad and 1,000 Moscow), and an additional 645,000 civilian reservists that were killed or captured are also included with civilian casualties. The statistic of forced labor deaths in Germany of 2.164 million includes the balance of POW'S and those convicted not included in Krivosheev's figures. In addition to these losses, a Russian demographic study of the wartime population indicated an increase of 1.3 million in infant mortality caused by the war and that 9–10 million of the 26.6 million total Soviet war dead were due to the worsening of living conditions in the USSR, including the region that was not occupied. The number deaths in the siege of Leningrad have been disputed. According to David Glantz, the 1945 Soviet estimate presented at the Nuremberg Trials was 642,000 civilian deaths. He noted that Soviet-era source from 1965 put the number of dead in the Siege of Leningrad at "greater than 800,000" and that a Russian source from 2000 put the number of dead at 1,000,000. These casualties are for 1941–1945 within the 1946–1991 borders of the USSR. Included with civilian losses are deaths in the territories annexed by the USSR in 1939–1940 including 600,000 in the Baltic states and 1,500,000 in Eastern Poland. Russian sources include Jewish Holocaust deaths among total civilian dead. Gilbert put Jewish losses at one million within 1939 borders; Holocaust deaths in the annexed territories numbered an additional 1.5 million, bringing total Jewish losses to 2.5 million.
- Alternative viewpoints According to the Russian demographer Dr. L.L. Rybakovsky, there are a wide range of estimates for total war dead by Russian scholars. He cites figures of total war dead that range from 21.8 million up to 28.0 million. Rybakovsky points out that the variables that are used to compute losses are by no means certain and are currently disputed by historians in Russia. Viktor Zemskov put the total war dead at 20 million, he maintained that the official figure of 26.6 million includes about 7 million deaths due to natural causes based on the mortality rate that prevailed before the war. He put military dead at 11.5 million, 4.5 million civilians killed and 4.0 due to famine and disease. Some Russian historians put the figure as high as 46.0 million by counting the population deficit due to children not born. Based on the birth rate prior to the war there is a population shortfall of about 20 million births during the war. The figures for the number of children born during the war and natural deaths are rough estimates because of a lack of vital statistics.
- There were additional casualties in 1939–40, which totaled 136,945: Battle of Khalkhin Gol in 1939 (8,931), Invasion of Poland of 1939 (1,139), and the Winter War with Finland in 1939–40 (126,875). The names of many Soviet war dead are presented in the OBD Memorial database online.

^AZ Spain

- There were 4,500 military deaths with the all Spanish Blue Division serving with the German Army in the U.S.S.R. The unit was withdrawn by Spain in 1943.
- R.J. Rummel estimates the deaths of 20,000 anti-Fascist Spanish refugees resident in France who were deported to Nazi camps, these deaths are included with French civilian casualties.

^BA Sweden

- During the Winter war of 1939–40 the Swedish Volunteer Corps served with the Finnish Armed Forces and lost 28 men in combat.
- 33 Swedish sailors were killed when submarine HMS Ulven was sunk by a German mine on April 16, 1943.
- During the war, Swedish merchant shipping was attacked by both German and Soviet submarines; 2,000 merchant seamen were killed.

^BB Switzerland

- The Americans accidentally bombed neutral Switzerland during the war causing civilian casualties.

^BC Thailand

- Military deaths included: 108 dead in the French–Thai War (1940–41) and 5,559 who died either resisting the Japanese invasion (1941), or fighting alongside Japanese forces in the Burma Campaign of 1942–45.
- Allied bombing in 1944–45 caused 2,000 civilian deaths.
- Unlike other parts of South East Asia, Thailand did not suffer from famine during the war.

^BD Turkey

- The Refah tragedy (Turkish: Refah faciası) refers to a maritime disaster during World War II, when the cargo steamer Refah of neutral Turkey, carrying Turkish military personnel from Mersin in Turkey to Port Said, Egypt was sunk in eastern Mediterranean waters by a torpedo fired from an unidentified submarine. Of the 200 passengers and crew aboard, only 32 survived.

^BE United Kingdom and Colonies

- The Commonwealth War Graves Commission reported a total of 383,758 military dead from all causes for both the UK and non-dominion British colonies, not including India which was reported separately; figures include identified burials and those commemorated by name on memorials. These figures include deaths that occurred after the war up until 31 December 1947.
- The Commonwealth War Graves Commission also maintains a Roll of Honour of those civilians under Crown Protection (including foreign nationals) who died as a result of enemy actions in the Second World War. The names of 67,170 are commemorated in the Civilian War Dead Roll of Honour.
- Modern updates of UK casualties including the wounded are contained in French, David (2000). Raising Churchill's Army: The British Army and the War against Germany 1919–1945. Oxford University Press. ISBN 978-0-19-924630-4. online Archived 2020-11-23 at the Wayback Machine
- The official UK report on war casualties of June 1946 provided a summary of the UK war losses, excluding colonies. This report (HMSO 6832) listed:

Total war dead of 357,116; Navy (50,758); Army (144,079); Air Force (69,606); Women's Auxiliary Territorial Service (624);
Merchant Navy (30,248); British Home Guard (1,206) and Civilians (60,595).
The total still missing on 2/28/1946 were 6,244; Navy (340); Army (2,267); Air Force (3,089); Women's Auxiliary Territorial Service (18);
Merchant Navy (530); British Home Guard (0) and Civilians (0).
These figures included the losses of Newfoundland and Southern Rhodesia.
Colonial forces are not included in these figures.
There were an additional 31,271 military deaths due to "natural causes" which are not included in these figures.
Deaths due to air and V-rocket attacks were 60,595 civilians and 1,206 British Home Guard.

- The preliminary 1945 data for UK colonial forces was killed 6,877, missing 14,208, wounded 6,972 and POW 8,115.
- UK casualties include losses of the colonial forces. UK colonial forces included units from East Africa, West Africa, Ghana, the Caribbean, Malaya, Burma, Hong Kong, Jordan, Sudan, Malta and the Jewish Brigade. The Cyprus Regiment made up of volunteers that fought with the UK Army, and suffered about 358 killed and 250 missing. Gurkhas recruited from Nepal fought with the British Army during the Second World War. Included with UK casualties are citizens of the various European countries occupied by Germany. There were separate RAF squadrons with citizens from Poland (17); Czechoslovakia (5); Netherlands (1); Free French (7); Yugoslavia (2); Belgium (3); Greece (3); Norway (2). Volunteers from the United States served in 3 RAF squadrons known as the Eagle Squadrons. Many foreign nationals and persons from the British colonies served in the UK Merchant Navy.

^BF United States
American military dead#^BF1

- Total U.S. military deaths in battle and from other causes were 407,316. The breakout by service is as follows: Army 318,274 (234,874 battle, 83,400 nonbattle), Navy 62,614, Marine Corps 24,511, and the Coast Guard 1,917.
- Deaths in battle were 292,131. The breakout by service is as follows: Army 234,874, Navy 36,950, Marine Corps 19,733, and Coast Guard 574. These losses were incurred during the period 12/8/41 until 12/31/46.
- During the period of America's neutrality in World War II (September 1, 1939 – December 8, 1941), U.S. military losses including 126 killed in October 1941 when the USS Kearny and the USS Reuben James were attacked by U-boats, as well as 2,335 killed during the surprise attack on Pearl Harbor by Japanese air forces on December 7, 1941.
- The United States Army Air Forces losses, which are included in the Army total, were 52,173 deaths due to combat and 35,946 from non-combat causes.
- According to the US Department of Defense, of the 407,300, about 250,000 died in the European theater, the rest died on the Pacific Front The details of U.S. military casualties are listed online: the U.S. Army, the U.S. Navy, and the U.S. Marine Corps.
- Of 34,648 U.S. Prisoners taken by Japan 12,935 died; of 95,532 captured in the European Theater of War, 1,124 died.
- U.S. Army figures include the deaths of 5,337 from the Philippines and 165 from Puerto Rico (see p. 118).
- The names of individual U.S. military personnel killed in World War II can be found at the U.S. National Archives.
- American Battle Monuments Commission website lists the names of military and civilian war dead from World War II buried in ABMC cemeteries or listed on Walls of the Missing.

American civilian dead #^BF2

- According to the Usmm.org, 9,521 merchant mariners lost their lives in the war (8,421 killed and 1,100 who later died of wounds). In 1950, the United States Coast Guard put U.S. Merchant Marine losses at 5,662 (845 due to enemy action, 37 in prison camps, and 4,780 missing), excluding U.S. Army transports and foreign flagged ships and they did not break out losses between the Atlantic and Pacific theaters.
- The names of U.S. Merchant Mariners killed in World War II are listed by USMM.org.
- The Civil Air Patrol assumed many missions including anti-submarine patrol and warfare, border patrols, and courier services. During World War II CAP's coastal patrol had flown 24 million miles, found 173 enemy U-boats, attacked 57, hit 10 and sunk 2, dropping a total of 83 bombs and depth charges throughout the conflict. By the end of the war, 64 CAP members had lost their lives in the line of duty.
- According to U.S. War Department figures, 18,745 American civilians were interned in the war (13,996 in the Far East and 4,749 in Europe). A total of 2,419 American civilian internees were listed as dead and missing. Under Japanese internment, 992 died and another 544 were listed as "unknown"; under German internment, 168 died and a further 715 were listed as "unknown".
- 68 U.S. civilians were killed during the attack on Pearl Harbor on December 7, 1941.
- The official U.S. report listed 1 U.S. civilian killed during the Battle of Guam on December 8–10. However, another source reported 13 "civilians" killed during the battle and 70 U.S. civilians were killed during the Battle of Wake Island from December 8–23, 1941. 98 U.S. civilian POWs were massacred by the Japanese on Wake Island in October 1943.
- During Japan's Aleutian Islands Campaign in Alaska in June 1942, a U.S. civilian was killed during the bombing of Dutch Harbor. The Japanese invaded the island of Attu, killing a white U.S. civilian and interned 45 Alaska Native Aleuts in Japan, in which 19 died during the rest of the war.
- Six U.S. civilians were killed in Oregon in May 1945 by Japanese balloon bombs.

^BG Yugoslavia

- The official Yugoslav figure for total war dead is 1.7 million (300,000 military and 1,400,000 civilians). This figure is cited in reference works dealing with World War II. Studies in Yugoslavia by Franjo Tudjman and Ivo Lah put losses at 2.1 million However, the official Yugoslav figure has been disputed studies by Vladimir Žerjavić and Bogoljub Kočović who put actual losses at about 1.0 million persons. The calculation of Yugoslav losses is not an exact accounting listing of the dead, but is based on demographic calculations of the population balance which estimate births during the war and natural deaths. The number of persons who emigrated after the war (ethnic Germans, Hungarians, Italians and Yugoslav refugees to the west) are rough estimates.
- The U.S. Bureau of the Census published a report in 1954 that concluded that Yugoslav war-related deaths were 1,067,000. The U.S. Bureau of the Census noted that the official Yugoslav government figure of 1.7 million war dead was overstated because it "was released soon after the war and was estimated without the benefit of a postwar census".
- A recent study by Vladimir Žerjavić estimates total war related deaths at 1,027,000, which included losses of 237,000 Yugoslav partisans and 209,000 "Quislings and collaborators" (see discussion below losses of Yugoslav collaborators) Civilian dead of 581,000 included 57,000 Jews. Losses by each Yugoslav republic were: Bosnia 316,000; Serbia 273,000; Croatia 271,000; Slovenia 33,000; Montenegro 27,000; Macedonia 17,000; and killed abroad 80,000.
- Bogoljub Kočović, a Yugoslav statistician, calculated the actual war losses at 1,014,000.
- Jozo Tomasevich, Professor Emeritus of Economics at San Francisco State University, stated that the calculations of Kočović and Žerjavić "seem to be free of bias, we can accept them as reliable".

The losses of Yugoslav collaborators

- Croatian emigres in the west made exaggerated allegations that 500,000–600,000 Croatians and Chetniks were massacred by the Partisans after the war; these claims are cited by Rudolph Rummel in his study Statistics of Democide.Jozo Tomasevich noted that the figures of the number of collaborators killed by the Partisans are disputed. According to Tomasevich some Croatian exiles "have been more moderate in their estimates", putting the death toll at "about 200,000". Regarding the death toll in the reprisals by the Yugoslav partisans Tomasevich believed that "It is impossible to establish the exact number of victims in these operations, although fairly accurate figures could probably be reached after much additional unbiased research".

The reasons for the high human toll in Yugoslavia were as follows A. Military operations between the occupying German military forces and their "Quislings and collaborators" against the Yugoslav resistance.
B. German forces, under express orders from Hitler, fought with a special vengeance against the Serbs, who were considered Untermensch. One of the worst one-day massacres during the German military occupation of Serbia was the Kragujevac massacre.
C. Deliberate acts of reprisal against target populations were perpetrated by all combatants. All sides practiced the shooting of hostages on a large scale. At the end of the war, many Ustaše and Slovene collaborators were killed in or as a result of the Yugoslav death march of Nazi collaborators.
D. The systematic extermination of large numbers of people for political, religious or racial reasons. The most numerous victims were Serbs. According to Yad Vashem, "During their four years in power, the Ustasa carried out a Serb genocide, exterminating over 500,000, expelling 250,000 and forcing another 200,000 to convert to Catholicism. The Ustasa also killed most of Croatia's Jews, 20,000 Gypsies, and many thousands of their political enemies." According to the United States Holocaust Memorial Museum "The Croat authorities murdered between 320,000 and 340,000 ethnic Serb residents of Croatia and Bosnia during the period of Ustaša rule; more than 30,000 Croatian Jews were killed either in Croatia or at Auschwitz-Birkenau". The USHMM reports between 77,000 and 99,000 persons were killed at the Jasenovac and Stara Gradiška concentration camps. The Jasenovac Memorial Site quotes a similar figure of between 80,000 and 100,000 victims. Stara Gradiška was a sub-camp of Jasenovac established for women and children. The names and data for 12,790 victims at Stara Gradiška have been established. Serbian sources currently claim that 700,000 persons were murdered at Jasenovac.
Some 40,000 Roma were murdered. Jewish victims in Yugoslavia totaled 67,122.
E. Reduced food supply caused famine and disease.
F. Allied bombing of German supply lines caused civilian casualties. The hardest hit localities were Podgorica, Leskovac, Zadar and Belgrade.
G. The demographic losses due to the reduction of 335,000 births and emigration of about 660,000 are not included with war casualties.

^BH Other Nations

- Dominican Republic had 27 Merchant Mariners killed.
