= The Holocaust in Yugoslavia =

The Holocaust in Yugoslavia includes:

- The Holocaust in the Independent State of Croatia
- The Holocaust in Serbia
- The Holocaust in Bulgaria
- The Holocaust in Slovenia
- The Holocaust in North Macedonia
