= Latvian Riflemen Soviet Divisions =

- Latviešu strēlnieku padomju divīzijas
- Active: 1940–1956
- Country: Soviet Union
- Branch: Red Army
- Size: about 70,000
- Mottos: Visu zemju proletārieši, savienojieties! ("Proletarians of all countries, unite!")
- March: The Internationale
- Battle honours: Honorable Red Flag of VTsIK

Latvian Riflemen Soviet Divisions were military formations of the Red Army during World War II created in 1941 and consisting primarily of ethnic Latvians.

== Background ==
After the occupation of Latvia in June 1940 the Soviet Armed Forces began to demobilize the Latvian Land Forces. The army was renamed People's Army and in September–November 1940- the Red Army's 24th Territorial Rifle Corps. In September the corps contained 24,416 men but in autumn more than 800 officers and about 10,000 instructors and soldiers were discharged. The arresting of soldiers continued in the following months. In June 1941, the entire Territorial Corps was sent to Litene camp. Before leaving the camp, Latvians drafted in 1939 were demobilised, and replaced by about 4000 Russian soldiers from area around Moscow. On June 10, the corps senior officers were sent to Russia where they were arrested and most of them shot. On June 14 at least 430 officers were arrested and sent to Gulag camps. After German attack to Soviet Union, from June 29 to July 1 more 2080 Latvian soldiers were demobilised, fearing that they might turn their weapons against the Russian commissars and officers. Simultaneously, many soldiers and officers deserted and when the corps crossed the Latvian border only about 3000 Latvian soldiers remained.

== Latvian workers regiments ==
In July 1940, 1st and 2nd workers regiments (the last later changed to 76th Latvian Rifle Regiment) were formed in Estonia from Latvian Workers Guard battalions and other active duty soldiers, who at the beginning of German attack, fled from Latvia to Estonia. 1st Latvian Workers Regiment was formed on July 18, 1941. Their strength was about 900 men, and that was subordinate to 8th Army (Soviet Union), 10th Rifle Corps. In the beginning the regiment guarded the Corps rear lines and fought with Estonian and Latvian Destruction battalions, but later joined in battles against the Army Group North (until July 29). The regiment suffered heavy losses, and at the end of July transferred to Suursaari Island and later to Kotlin Island (Kronstadt). From the left over regiment was later formed (3rd through September 7) Latvian Battalion (commander Žanis Grīva-Folkmanis), which was part of the Red Army's 10th Rifle Division, 62nd Regiment. The Latvian battalion had only 283 soldiers. By riflemen, Germans battalions destroyed them and the remaining part retreated to Leningrad, and Peterhof to be placed in 76th Latvian Riflemen Regiment. 2nd Regiment was formed July 15, also in Estonia. The regiment's strength was about 1,200 soldiers. In Estonia, the regiment suffered heavy losses (from July 24 until August 4), then was surrounded, but broke out and fought in the Leningrad Oblast until October 20. On September 4 the regiment transferred to 76th Latvian Rifle Regiment. On October 22 on account of heavy losses the regiment was disbanded January 1942 and the leftover soldiers were transferred to other Latvian Rifle Divisions.

== 43rd Latvian Riflemen Guards Rifle Division ==
See 201st Motor Rifle Division and 43rd Guards Rifle Division.

== 308th Rifle Division ==
See 308th Rifle Division

== 1st Latvian Riflemen Reserve Regiment ==
Regiment was organized on February 18, 1942. That was subordinate to Moscow Military District, placed at Gorokhovets. Commander was P. Alksnis-Dreimanis, later H. Šponbergs. Regiment trained and placed with 201st (later: 43rd Guard) Division, Second Army (Poland) and Latvian partisans, and gave cadets to the forming of the Latvian Air Regiment.

== Separate units ==
Latvian Riflemen name was given to its aviation squadron, which contained 10 planes. This squadron belonged to 1st Air Army, 303rd Aviation Division, 18th Guards Assault Aviation Regiment, and joined in battles for Briańsk, Western Front (Soviet Union) and 3rd Belorussian Front. Also the Latvian Riflemen name was given to a column (10 tanks T-34). On August 16, 1942, they formed a Latvian Separate Reserve Riflemen Regiment in the Gorokhovets region as 246th Tank Brigade. This tank unit joined in the Battle of Stalingrad, Ilovla, and the Prague Offensive. 1st Latvian Bomber Aviation Regiment was founded September 1943. Until July 12, 1943, it was the 24th Latvian Aviation Squadron. This Regiment supported the XXIV Latvian Territorial Corps. The 1st Latvian Bomber Regiment contained 3 squadrons and assigned reserve units. Their commander was Regiment Commander K. Kirss, an Estonian. On September 28, 1943, the regiment joined the Northwestern Front, 6th Air Army, 242nd Bomber Division. Later the regiment was attached to other air force units, with a greater part in night bombing. The Latvian Air Regiment joined greatly the operations in the Baltic region. On August 9, 1944, the regiment transferred to 1st Rēzekne Latvian Night Bomber Aviation Regiment, the name of which came for the massive bombardment of Rēzekne in the spring preceding the Battle of Rēzekne executed by the regiment. Later (October 1, 1945) it transferred to 322nd Rēzekne Latvian Night Bomber Aviation Regiment. Battle orders to the regiment also included the Courland Pocket. Overall they flew 6,475 combat missions.

== Mobilisation in 1944-45 ==
Following the Soviet re-occupation of Latvia in 1944 mobilisation of persons born between 1903 and 1926 began in Eastern Latvia on July 27 and in Riga on November 3. According to Soviet sources, a total of 50,000 Latvian citizens were mobilised in combatant units by the end of the war (not only in the Latvian units, but also in other Red Army units). However many Latvians evaded mobilisation and deserted. By January 1945, 2214 soldiers had deserted and by February 1529 soldiers had been sent to Gulag camps. The Latvian Division in Soviet Army continued operating in Latvia after the war until 1956.
