= Latvian Legion =

Nazi German Waffen-SS unit (1943–1945)

Latvian Legion of the Waffen-SS
- Arm Shield
- Active: February 1943 – 1945
- Country: Latvia
- Allegiance: Nazi Germany
- Branch: Waffen SS; VI SS Army Corps (Latvian); 15th Waffen Grenadier Division of the SS (1st Latvian); 19th Waffen Grenadier Division of the SS (2nd Latvian)
- Type: Infantry
- Size: 87,550 men as of July 1, 1944; with another 23,000 men as Wehrmacht auxiliaries
- Motto: Dievs, svētī Latviju! ("God bless Latvia!")
- Colors: Latvian national colors
- March: Zem mūsu kājām lielceļš balts ("White Road under our feet"), Trīnīte
- Engagements: Eastern Front (World War II): Siege of Leningrad; East Pomeranian Offensive; Courland Pocket; Battle of Berlin; Battle of More Parish; Battle of Tannenberg Line; Battle of ''Hill 93.4''

Commanders
- Notable commanders: Karl Pfeffer-Wildenbruch; Hinrich Schuldt; Friedrich-Wilhelm Bock; Carl Friedrich von Pückler-Burghauss; Rūdolfs Bangerskis; Kārlis Lobe; Voldemārs Veiss; Arvīds Krīpens; Voldemārs Skaistlauks; Augusts Apsītis-Apse; Vilis Janums

The Latvian Legion (Latvian: Latviešu leģions) was a formation of the Nazi German Waffen-SS during World War II. Formed in 1943, it consisted primarily of ethnic Latvian men. The legion initially consisted of two divisions of the Waffen-SS: the 15th Waffen Grenadier Division of the SS (1st Latvian), and the 19th Waffen Grenadier Division of the SS (2nd Latvian). Later in the war, Arajs Kommando was disbanded and some of its members were transferred to the Latvian Legion.

The 15th Division was administratively subordinated to the VI SS Corps, but operationally it was in reserve or at the disposal of the XXXXIII Army Corps, 16th Army, Army Group North. The 19th Division held out in the Courland Pocket until May 1945, the close of World War II, when it was among the last of Nazi Germany's forces to surrender.

== Creation ==
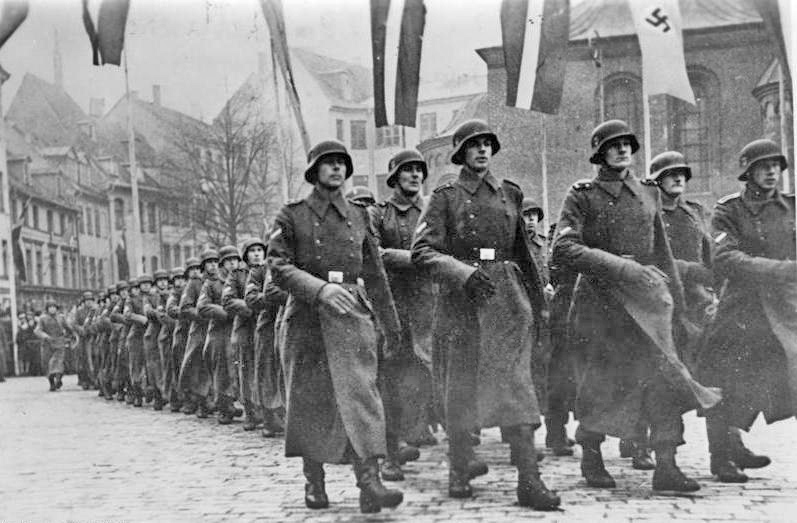
Latvian Waffen-SS legionnaires marching next to Riga Cathedral in Riga on Latvian Independence Day, 1943

All-volunteer Latvian Auxiliary Police Battalions were formed in late 1941 for security duties and serving on the Eastern Front under Wehrmacht command. The Latvian Legion was formed on the orders of Adolf Hitler following a request by Heinrich Himmler, head of the SS; the 15th Division (1st Brigade) was created on 25 February 1943. The 2nd Brigade was formed in May 1943 but was not designated as the 19th Division until early 1944.

Holocaust perpetrators Arajs Kommando were merged into the Legion, in December 1943, with the former Arajs unit placed in charge of the 3rd Battalion. They were less than 5% of the Latvian Legion.

Under the Rosenberg labour decree of December 1941, the Germans began conscripting Latvians in early 1942, giving them a choice between joining the labour service or the police battalions. One month after the unit was founded, German occupation authorities in Latvia started conscripting military-age men specifically for the Legion. Draftees were given a choice between serving in the Wehrmacht-subordinated Waffen-SS Legion, serving as German Wehrmacht auxiliaries, or in the paramilitary Reich Labour Service (Reichsarbeitsdienst). Unlike in Lithuania, potential recruits in Latvia did not organise an official boycott of conscription. Of the approximately 80,000 Latvians initially called up for "voluntary" service, 85% chose to register, a surprisingly high number and on the same level as in the German Reich.

When Nazi Germany began losing the war, conscription was extended to larger and larger numbers of Latvians. The first conscription, in 1943, applied to all Latvian men born from 1919 to 1924. Subsequent conscriptions eventually extended to Latvians born between 1906 and 1928. The division commanders and most of the staff were German SS officers. Latvian officers typically commanded individual combat regiments. Only about 15% of those who served did so voluntarily.

After the Red Army broke through German lines at Nevel along the 1st Baltic Front in November 1943, advancing on Latvia, the Latvian Self-Administration took over mobilisation from the Germans on November 13. By June 26 there were 7,671 ethnic Russians from Latvia's Latgale, representing 10 % of the Legion's men, serving in various units of the Latvian Legion. On July 1, 1944, the Latvian Legion had 87,550 men. Another 23,000 Latvians were serving as Wehrmacht "auxiliaries".

== Operational history ==
The first Latvian Legion unit was the 2nd Latvian SS Infantry Brigade, created in February 1943. It fought its first battle in the Siege of Leningrad, opposite the Pulkovo Observatory on 18 March 1943. It continued fighting around Leningrad until the German forces retreated in January 1944.

The 15th Waffen-SS Division was formed and sent to the front in November 1943. Originally, it was sent to the Ostrov and Novosokolniki districts of Pskov Oblast, but after the German Army suffered setbacks there, it was moved to positions in the Belebelka district of Novgorod Oblast in January 1944. It retreated from there a month later. At the end of February 1944, both units took defensive positions on the Sorota and Velikaya rivers. At that time, the 2nd Brigade was renamed the 19th Waffen-SS Division. Over the next two months, these positions saw intense fighting.

In April 1944, the Legion was replaced by other units and moved to less active positions in Bardovo-Kudever, 50 km east of Opochka. It came under attack there in June 1944 and retreated on July 10, 1944, crossing the Latvian-Russian border on July 17.

In August and September 1944, the 15th Division moved to Prussia to replenish with new recruits. It trained near Danzig until it was ordered into battle on 22 January 1945. At that time, the division consisted of about 15,000 soldiers. It fought near Danzig in January and February, retreating to Pomerania in early March. By early April, the division was reduced to 8,000 men. About 1,000 were sent by sea to replenish the forces in the Courland Pocket, and the rest were lost in the fighting. On April 11, the division learned of plans to transfer the entire division to Courland. Seeing that the war was lost and understanding that being sent to Courland would eventually mean surrendering to the Soviets, the division decided to surrender to the Western Allies instead, disobeying German orders when necessary.

The 19th Division continued to fight in Latvia. In October 1944, Soviet advances in Lithuania cut off all units in the Courland Pocket from the rest of the German forces. It was part of the six battles between Soviet and German armies in the Courland Pocket in 1944 and 1945. During the third battle in December 1944, the opposing Soviet units included two Latvian divisions, the 43rd Guards Rifle Division and the 308th Rifle Division, formed from recruits drafted in Soviet-occupied Eastern Latvia. When Latvian units from both sides of the front faced one another, they were quite unwilling and occasionally disengaged without firing a shot. The Soviet command transferred the Latvian divisions elsewhere after a few days. Together with other units in the Courland Pocket, the 19th Division surrendered to the Soviets at the end of the war on May 9, 1945. Subsequently, almost 50,000 Latvian soldiers became Soviet prisoners of war in filtration or gulag camps. Some of the Legion's soldiers continued fighting the Soviets as Forest Brothers for up to ten years after the end of the war.

== Motivation of Latvian Legionnaires ==
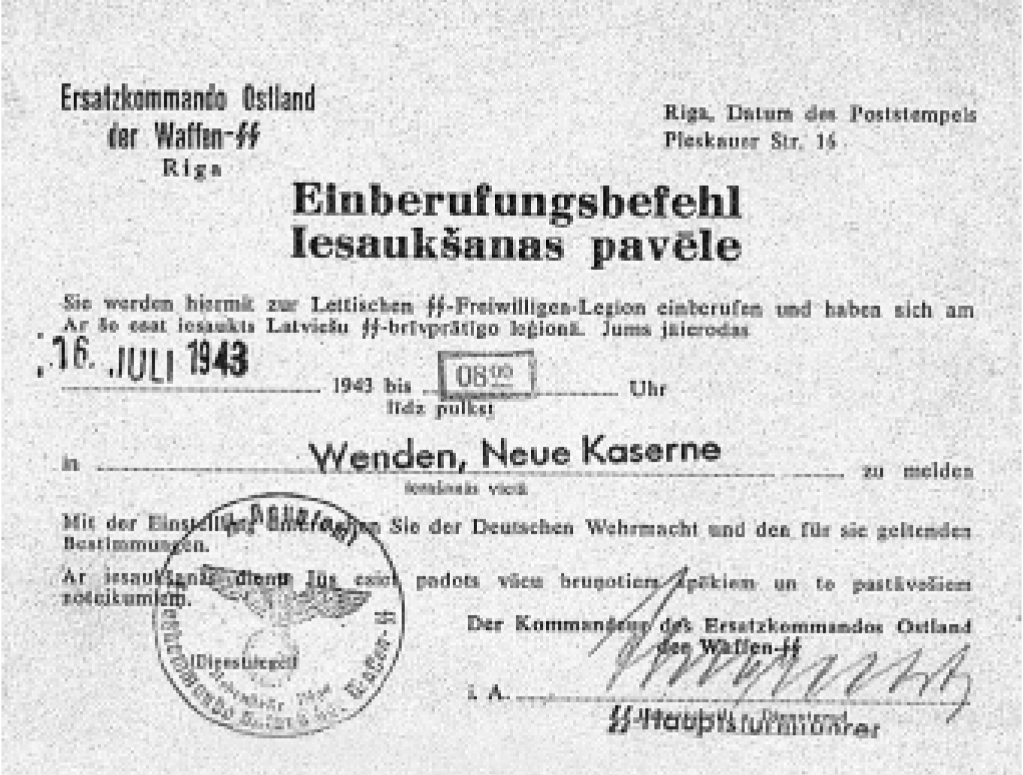
Conscription order

Oberführer Adolf Ax, commander of the 15th Division, reported on 27 January 1945:

They are first and foremost Latvians. They want a sustainable Latvian nation-state. Forced to choose between Germany and Russia, they chose Germany because they seek co-operation with Western civilisation. The rule of the Germans seems to them to be the lesser of two evils."

This perspective resulted in part from the Soviet occupation between 1940 and 1941, called "The Year of Terror" (Latvian: Baigais gads) during which tens of thousands of Latvian families were executed or deported to Siberia with men separated from the women and children to break down resistance.

Legion command emphasised that the Latvians were fighting against Soviet re-occupation. Conscripts promised in the name of God to be subservient to the German military and its commander Adolf Hitler, to be courageous and to be prepared to give up their life "in the fight against Bolshevism". Legionnaires hoped to fight off the Red Army until it was no longer a threat to Latvia and then turn against Nazi Germany, as a repeat of the Latvian War of Independence of 1918–1920, when Latvian forces expelled both Bolshevik and German forces. Legionnaires carried Latvian flags under their uniforms as a symbol of that hope. This sentiment was also reflected in one of the most popular Legion songs with the lines: "We'll beat those lice-infested ones – again, again. After that we'll trounce those blue-grays – again, again" (with euphemisms for Bolsheviks and Germans). The Allies confirmed this as early as 1943, when a British investigative mission found Latvians stood against both their Soviet and German occupiers.

Latvians, as did the Estonians and to a lesser degree Lithuanians, believed that the Western powers, especially Britain, would come to their aid as they had in 1918–1920. These hopes were bolstered by Allied communications received in November 1944 in which British command instructed them to hold Courland until a joint British-American fleet entered the Baltic.

== After World War II ==
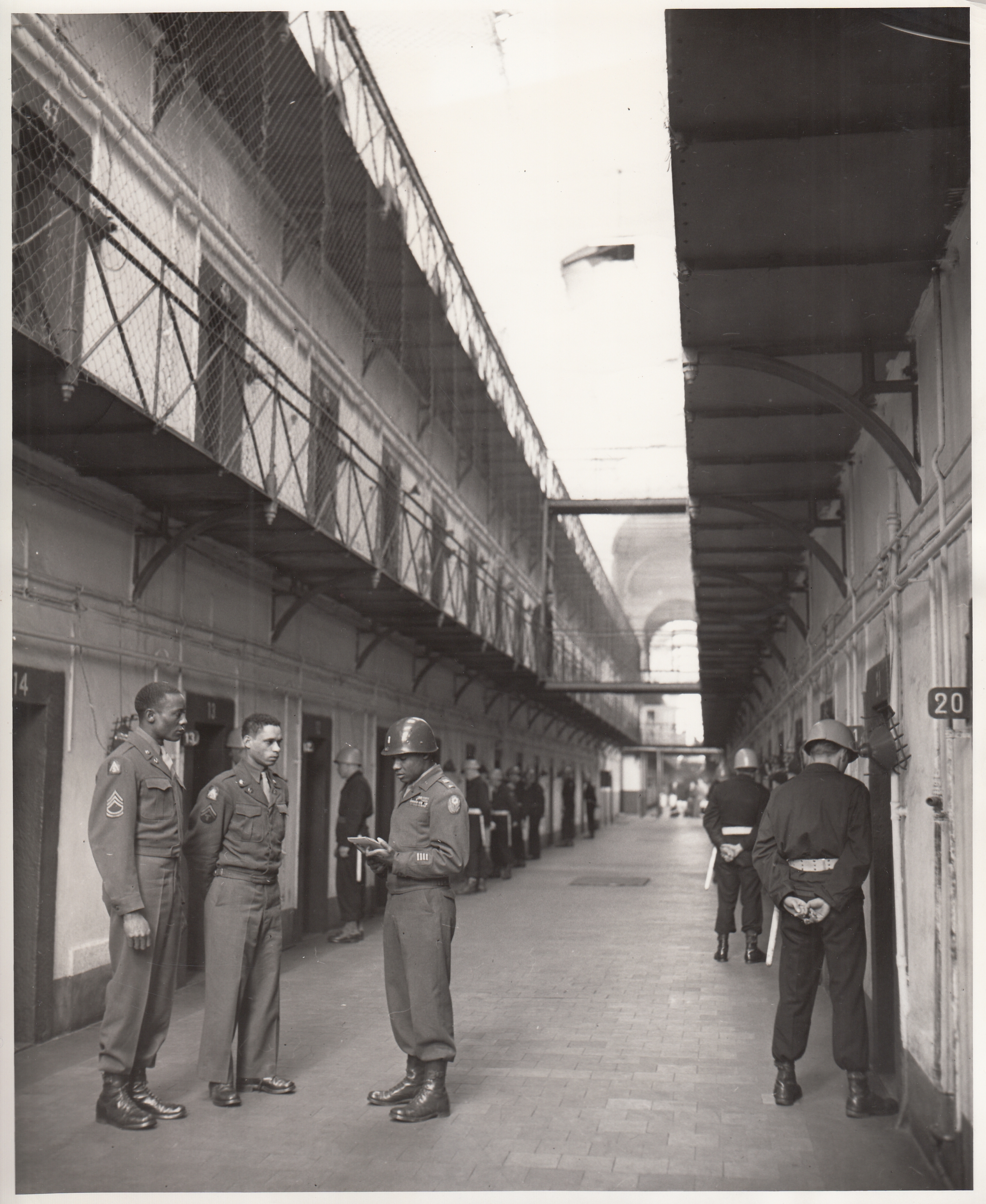
Baltic guards, wearing black uniforms with blue helmets and white belts, guarding Nazi prisoners during the Nuremberg trials

In 1946, the Nuremberg Tribunal declared the Waffen-SS to be a criminal organisation, making an exception for people who had been forcibly conscripted. The Nuremberg Tribunal ruled that those who had served in the Baltic Legions were conscripts, not volunteers.

Subsequently, on 13 April 1950, a message from the Allied High Commission (HICOG), signed by John J. McCloy to the Secretary of State, clarified the US position on the Baltic Legions:

"they were not to be seen as 'movements', 'volunteer', or 'SS'. In short, they had not been given the training, indoctrination, and induction normally given to SS members".

With the full support of Nuremberg and the Allied High Commission, the US Displaced Persons Commission declared in September 1950 that:

"The Baltic Waffen SS Units (Baltic Legions) are to be considered as separate and distinct in purpose, ideology, activities, and qualifications for membership from the German SS, and therefore the Commission holds them not to be a movement hostile to the government of the United States."

Even before this decision, around 1,000 former Latvian Legion soldiers had served as guards at the Nuremberg trials, guarding Nazi war criminals. Afterwards, during the Berlin Blockade, they took part in securing Allied facilities involved in the Berlin Airlift and later also guarded US Army headquarters.

During the Soviet period, the Latvian Legion were described as having been illegally conscripted by Nazi Germany in 1943, with no indication of being war criminals or of Holocaust involvement. For example, the Soviet film I Remember Everything, Richard (also known as Rock and Splinters in its uncut release), made during the 1960s (during the Cold War) at the Riga Film Studio, while being full of Soviet propaganda clichés, clearly illustrates recognition of several essential aspects with respect to Legion soldiers, amongst those: that they were front-line soldiers, they were mostly forcefully conscripted, and they were not supporters of Nazi ideology. This contrasts sharply with Russia's post-Soviet stance, which denounces the Legion as Waffen-SS war criminals and uses the Legion issue to assert political and ideological pressure on Latvia on the international scene.

In 1946, the coalition government of Sweden led by the Social Democrats, despite strong protests from many sectors of Swedish society, extradited soldiers from the Latvian Legion (also some Estonian Legion and Lithuanian soldiers) who had fled to Sweden and were interned there to the USSR. In the 1990s, the Swedish government admitted this was a mistake. Surviving Baltic veterans were invited to Sweden in 1994, where they were met by the King of Sweden Carl XVI Gustaf and the Minister for Foreign Affairs of Sweden Margaretha af Ugglas and took part in ceremonies commemorating the events surrounding their extradition. Both the King and the Minister for Foreign Affairs expressed their regret for Sweden's past extradition of Baltic Legion soldiers to the Soviet Union.

Leanid Kazyrytski argues that the Latvian Legion has all the features of a criminal organisation specified at the Nuremberg trials: the conscription procedure into the Legion had certain peculiarities that do not allow one to speak definitively of its compulsory character.

== War crimes ==
The previous involvement of some Latvian Legion members in the Holocaust, including 600 members of the Arajs Kommando, and the inclusion of Latvian ultranationalist Pērkonkrusts members, and other Holocaust participants, has led to accusations that, under international military law, the legion met the criteria for a criminal organisation and/or that a significant proportion of its members, were directly or indirectly involved in war crimes. Finnish journalist and writer Jukka Rislakki has called the branding of all 57,000 legionnaires as war criminals on the basis of war crimes previously committed by some of its members as part of Arajs Kommando and Latvian Auxiliary Police battalions "a typical example of "guilt by association.""

== Remembrance Day of the Latvian Legionnaires ==
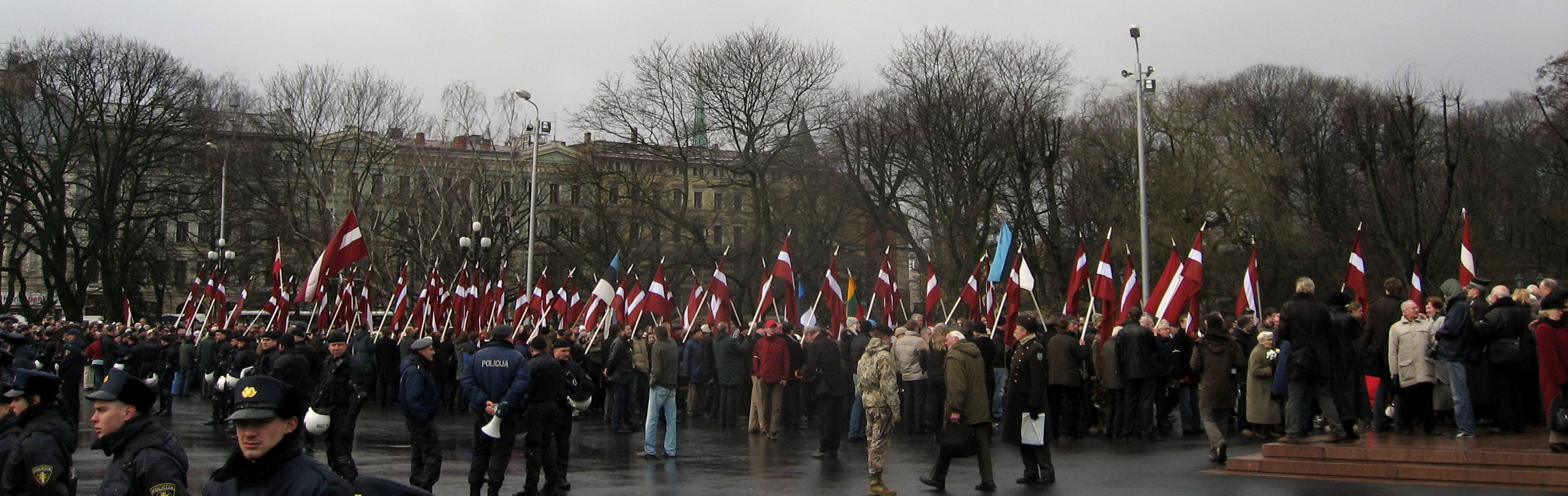
Remembrance Day of the Latvian Legionnaires, 2008

In the years after the war, 16 March was chosen by the Latvian Legion veterans' organisation in Western exile, Hawks of Daugava, as the day of the Latvian Legion, to commemorate a battle on the eastern shore of the Velikaya River for Hill "93,4", fought by both the 15th and 19th Waffen-SS divisions. Latvia has publicly observed it since 1989/90. The day was officially recognized as a "Remembrance Day for Latvian soldiers" by the Saeima in 1998, a compromise between the For Fatherland and Freedom/LNNK party who wanted to establish the day as the "Remembrance Day for the Latvian Legion" and other members of the coalition fearing the potential effect such a move would have on the international reputation of Latvia.

The 16 March events have been quite confrontational in recent years, with Latvian nationalist organisations (such as the National Alliance and National Union "Justice") marching in support of the Latvian Legion, and predominantly Russian organisations (Latvian Russian Union) holding protests and attempting to block the marches. Because of a particularly harsh controversy over the official commemoration of Remembrance Day for the Latvian Legionnaires in 1998, Latvian officials refrain from officially honouring it. Currently, the official position of Latvian authorities is that the day is a primarily private business of the veterans and their relatives.

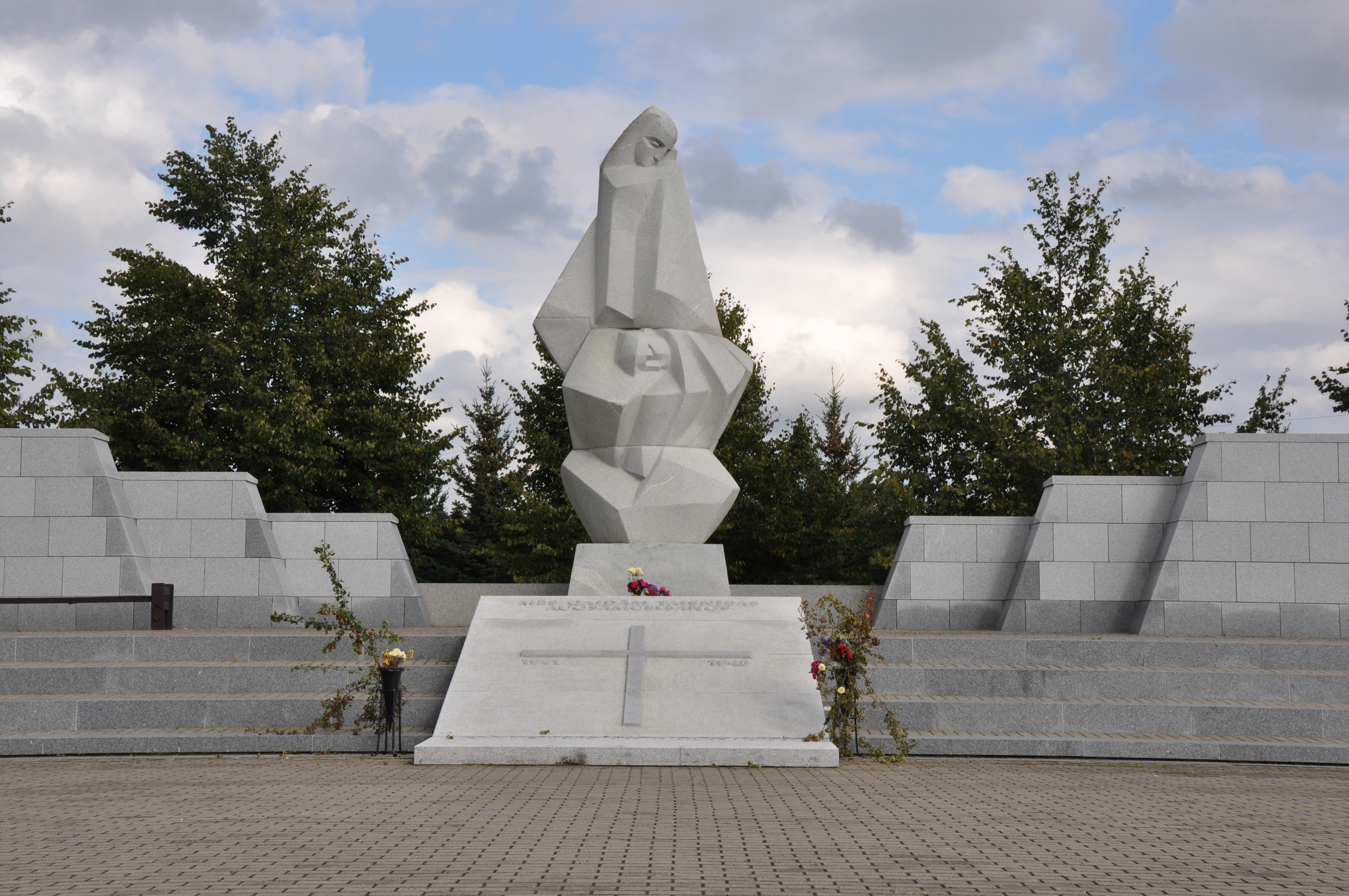
Cemetery of Latvian Legion soldiers in Lestene parish

On 21 February 2012, the Council of Europe's Commission against Racism and Intolerance published its report on Latvia (fourth monitoring cycle), in which it condemned commemorations of persons who fought in the Waffen-SS and collaborated with the Nazis. ECRI expressed concerns as regards the authorisation of a gathering, commemorating soldiers who had fought in a Latvian unit of the Waffen-SS, that takes place every year on 16 March and is held in the centre of Riga, and expressed dismay at the authorisation by the competent courts of an event set to celebrate the Nazi occupation of Riga (on 1 July). It also expressed concern that the former Minister of Foreign Affairs had not condemned the march, and, on the contrary, supported it. ECRI recommended that "the Latvian authorities condemn all attempts to commemorate persons who fought in the Waffen SS and collaborated with the Nazis. ECRI further recommends that the authorities ban any gathering or march legitimising in any way Nazism."

On 13 March 2014, UK Labour MEP Richard Howitt, a spokesperson for the European Parliament Human Rights Sub-Committee, issued a statement that included the view that "Whether local boys were forced to don the SS uniforms or were eager volunteers, celebration of their actions not only insults the memory of the victims but also honours Nazism itself." On his own website, Howitt, citing the Waffen-SS marches, criticised the Conservative Party for its alliance with nationalist elements in the Latvian government.

== See also ==
- Declaration on Latvian Legionnaires in World War II
- Estonian Legion
- I Remember Everything, Richard, film
- Luftwaffen-Legion Lettland
