= I Remember Everything, Richard =

1966 Soviet film produced by the Riga Film Studio

I Remember Everything, Richard (Rock and Splinter)
- Directed by: Rolands Kalniņš
- Starring: Eduards Pāvuls; Antra Liedskalniņa; Harijs Liepiņš; Pauls Butkēvičs; Uldis Pūcītis
- Cinematography: Miks Zvirbulis
- Music by: Ludgards Gedravičus
- Distributed by: Riga Film Studio; Gilde Film Studio
- Release date: 1966
- Running time: 83 minutes
- Country: USSR (Latvian SSR)
- Languages: Latvian, Russian

I Remember Everything, Richard (Latvian: Es visu atceros, Ričard) is a 1966 Soviet film produced during Soviet period at the Riga Film Studio. Another name for the film is Rock and Splinters (Latvian: Akmens un šķembas), which is normally applied to the uncut version.

The film's director was Rolands Kalniņš.

== Plot ==
Three friends — Jānis, Zigis, and Ričards — are mobilized into the Latvian Legion during World War II, where they fight against the Red Army in the Volkhov Marshes. Zigis is killed while attempting to desert to the Soviets. After the war, Jānis is amnestied and remains in Soviet Latvia, accepting the new order, while Ričards is missing. Twenty years later, the two surviving friends meet again. Ričards, who has returned from abroad on a secret mission, has become an agent of Western intelligence services hostile to the Soviet regime.

The film portrays the events surrounding the participation of the Latvian Legion in battles against the Soviets on the Leningrad Front, particularly during the Battle of Leningrad, with the focus on a critical moment where Ričards takes part in executing a captured Latvian Red Army soldier to save his friend Zigis. Afterward, Ričards is sent to Germany, recruited by Western powers, and tasked with a mission in Latvia to destroy the Latvian Warriors' Monument at the Brothers' Cemetery, Riga.

In the finale, Ričards kills his friend Jānis and realizes that he has lost everything—his wife, his friend, and his homeland. His secret mission is exposed, and he is arrested.

While produced during the Soviet period and full of Soviet propaganda clichés, the film rather objectively describes the events surrounding the participation of the Latvian Legion in battles against Soviets on the Leningrad Front during World War II.

== Cast ==
The film's cast included several notable Latvian actors: Eduards Pāvuls, Antra Liedskalniņa, Harijs Liepiņš, Pauls Butkēvičs, Uldis Pūcītis.
