= Hawks of Daugava =

Latvian SS unit veterans association founded in 1945; active branches in Europe and USA

- Daugavas Vanagi
- Hawks of Daugava logo
- Formation: December 28, 1945; 80 years ago
- Founded at: Zedelgem, Belgium
- Type: NGO veterans' organization
- Purpose: Veteran support
- Headquarters: Riga, Latvia
- Origins: Latvian Legion; Nationalist, anti-Soviet, anti-communist
- Services: Mutual aid, assistance to the wounded and disabled
- Official language: Latvian
- Key people: Kārlis Lobe; Vilis Janums; Rūdolfs Bangerskis; Zenta Mauriņa; Boļeslavs Maikovskis

Hawks of Daugava (Latin: Daugavas Vanagi) is a Latvian nationalist, antisoviet organization. It was created after World War II in a prisoner of war camp in Zedelgem, Belgium, on 28 December 1945. The founders and members of the organization were former Latvian Legionnaires.

The organization's center was located in Münster (FRG); branches were created in twelve Western countries. The organization had more than 9,000 members in 135 local branches.

The initial goal of the organization was to help veterans of the Latvian Legion and their families. The society actively participated in marches on the Legionnaire Day on 16 March. The chairman was Artūrs Silgailis, one of the organizers of the movement was Kārlis Lobe. Famous members of the organization included: Vilis Janums, General Rūdolfs Bangerskis and Zenta Mauriņa.

== History ==
The Daugava Hawks were created as a veterans' organization of legionnaires who, after the end of World War II, found themselves mainly in West Germany. Initially, the goals of the organization were declared to be mutual aid, assistance to the wounded and disabled. As former legionnaires left for other Western countries, they created Hawks branches there as well.

Until 1950, in the United States, the Latvian Legion was considered a unit of Hitler's army, so its former fighters were prohibited from entering the United States as refugees. However, by 1950, the efforts of representatives of the Latvian diaspora in the United States who sympathized with the legionnaires and their organizations, as well as the efforts of the "Hawks" themselves, led to the formation of informal groups in the country.

The "Hawks" and their Latvian sympathizers argued that although the Latvian SS Legion fought in the ranks of the Nazi army, they should not be considered Hitler's accomplices, but Latvian heroes who fought the Soviets not to help the Germans, but for the sole purpose of fighting communism and preventing the Soviets from invading Latvia. The fact that the Germans also fought the Soviets was treated as a coincidence, and the alliance between the Latvian Legion and the German army as a necessity. Therefore, in 1951, restrictions on the entry of former legionnaires into the United States were lifted. As a result, a large number of legionnaires entered the United States and joined informal cells of the Daugava Hawks, as well as formed new branches.

Since the number of immigrant legionnaires was insufficient to form effective organizations, the Hawks opened their doors to anyone who wanted to join, not just war veterans. Thus, the number of cells in the United States grew to 15-20 (according to another FBI informant, to 55), and their membership to 400-600 people. The cells held regular meetings and issued a bulletin. The main activity consisted of holding charity events (picnics, dance parties) to raise funds for the benefit of Legion veterans who suffered during the "Russian campaign". The Hawks' attitude was anti-communist: they supported all actions aimed at Latvia's secession from the Soviet Union. The Hawks became the second largest Latvian anti-communist organization in the United States. Most of the cells were led by former career officers of the Latvian army.

One of the influential members of the organization in New York in 1952-1965, representing it in the Association of American Latvians, was Boļeslavs Maikovskis, the organizer of the Audriņi massacre in the winter of 1941-1942. His membership in Daugavas Vanagi gave the USSR grounds to consider this organization as one aiding war criminals. The book Daugavas vanagi – who are they? (1963) addressed the foreign public, contains documentary evidence of the atrocities in Audriņi.

Hawks of Daugava in Germany from 1967 to 1973 was headed by Janis Cirulis, who was accused in USSR of participating in the Zhestianaya Gorka massacre in the Novgorod Oblast.

== See also ==
- Daugava (river)
