= Genocide of the Soviet people =

Term used to describe Nazi atrocities in the Soviet Union

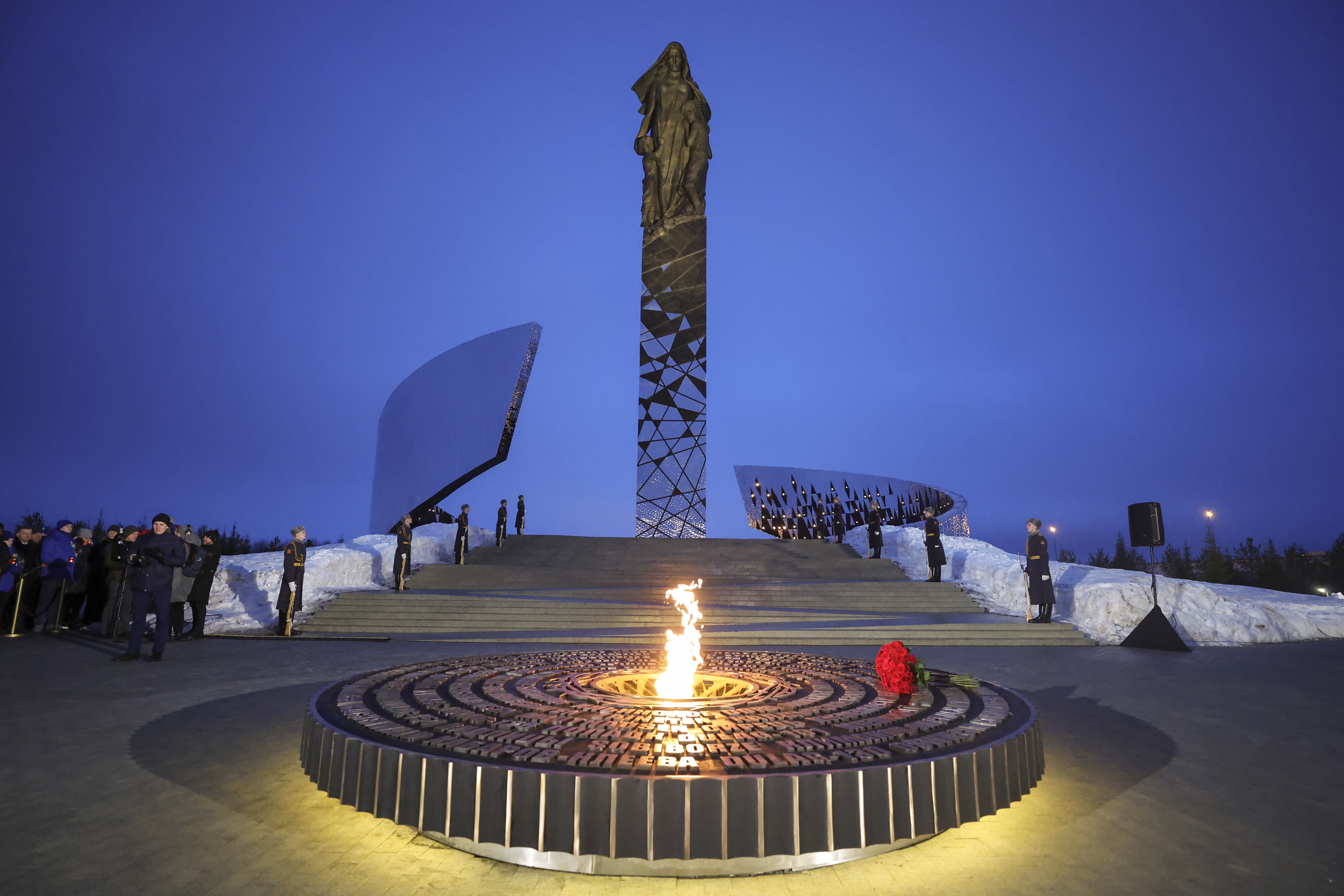
Memorial to the genocide of the Soviet people (unveiled in 2024)

Genocide of the Soviet people is a novel concept introduced in early 21st century in Russia. It classifies the actions of Nazi Germany and its allies as genocide of the Soviet citizens. It was formalized in the Russian Federal Law No. 74-ФЗ of April 21, 2025 "On the Perpetuation of the Memory of the Victims of the Genocide of the Soviet People during the Great Patriotic War of 1941–1945" (Russian: Об увековечении памяти жертв геноцида советского народа в период Великой Отечественной войны 1941 – 1945 годов).

Other major official developments in this respect are the declaring April 19 to be the Day of Remembrance of the Victims of the Genocide of the Soviet People and the replacement of the Gulag History Museum with the Museum of Remembrance of the Victims of Genocide of the Soviet People, announced in February 2026.

Commentators point out that this concept was absent in the Soviet Union and question both the motives underlying the introduction of the concept and whether it fits the commonly accepted definition of genocide.

== Background ==
For the first time the term "genocide of the peoples of the Soviet Union" was officially used in an October 2020 ruling of the 2019 case related to the killing of the Soviet civilians near the village of Zhestyanaya Gorka.

== Russian law ==
The 2025 Russian law defines the concept as follows:

The genocide of the Soviet people is recognized to be the actions of the Nazis and their accomplices during the Great Patriotic War of 1941-1945, aimed at the complete or partial destruction of national, ethnic and racial groups inhabiting the territory of the USSR, by killing members of these groups, causing serious harm to their health, forcibly preventing childbirth, forced transfer of children, forced resettlement or other creation of living conditions aimed at bringing about the physical destruction of the members of these groups.

In March–April 2026 a federal law introduced changes in the Criminal Code of Russia in this regard. Article 243^{4} criminalizes attacks on the burial sites of victims of the genocide of the Soviet people and objects perpetuating their memory, in Russia and abroad. Article 354^{1}criminalizes the denial of the genocide of the Soviet people, approval of this genocide, and insulting the memory of its victims.

Similar laws were introduced in Belarus.

== See also ==
- Generalplan Ost
- Memory war
- Siege of Leningrad
