= Kārlis Lobe =

Latvian SS officer (1895–1985)

- Born: 26 March 1895; Jaunpiebalga parish, Russian Empire
- Died: 9 July 1985 (aged 90); Stockholm, Sweden
- Military career
- Allegiance: Russian Empire (to 1920); Latvia (to 1940); Nazi Germany (to 1945)
- Rank: Colonel
- Units: 2. Riga Latvian Riflemen Regiment; Army of Kolchak; Imanta Regiment; 4. Zemgale Infantry Division; 1. Kurzeme Infantry Division; 19th Waffen Grenadier Division of the SS (2nd Latvian)
- Awards: Order of St. Anna; Order of Saint Stanislaus; Order of the Three Stars 5th Class; Order of Viesturs 3rd Class; Iron Cross 1st & 2nd Class; German Cross in Gold; Hawks of Daugava pin in Gold; Knight of the Royal Swedish Order of the Sword, 1st class (1929)

Kārlis Lobe (26 March 1895 – 9 July 1985) was a Latvian officer in the Imperial Russian Army, Latvian Army and the Latvian Legion, recipient of the Order of the Three Stars.

== Biography ==
Kārlis Lobe was born in "Janēni" homestead in Jaunpiebalga parish, Cēsis district. He graduated the Piebalga congregation school, and in 1914 an agricultural school in the vicinity of Pskov.

=== World War I ===
In 1916 he graduated from military academy and joined the 2. Riga Latvian Riflemen Regiment, where he commanded a company in the Christmas Battles of 1916/1917. In 1918, after the October Revolution, Lobe joined the Army of Kolchak, and later commanded the Latvian Imanta Regiment founded in Vladivostok, with which he intended to return to Latvia to join the War of Independence.

=== Latvian Army ===
Lobe returned to Riga in 1920 and joined the Latvian Army. From 1921 he was a lecturer at the Military academy, at the rank of a captain. In 1932 Lobe graduated from the Higher Military Academy courses, and in 1935 was placed in command of the 12. Bauska Infantry Regiment of the 4. Zemgale Infantry Division. In April 1938 he was transferred to the Military academy. In 1939 he was promoted to lieutenant colonel and appointed at chief of staff of 2. Ventspils Infantry Regiment of the 1. Kurzeme Infantry Division. During the year of Soviet occupation Lobe escaped repression and deportations. Lobe married his wife Milda (b. 13 February 1898 in Latvia) on 22 May 1922. She died on 31 May 1985, at Österhaninge south of Stockholm, Sweden.

=== World War II ===
After the German invasion of the USSR Lobe became the commander of the Ventspils self-defence force. There is conflicting information regarding Lobe's participation in the Holocaust, as of now his involvement is yet to be definitively proven. At the end of 1941 Lobe was appointed head of the Latvian self-defence force. Later he was involved in anti-partisan operations against Soviet guerillas in Eastern Latvia and Belarus with the Latvian police battalions. In spring of 1943 Lobe became commander of the 2. (Imanta) Infantry Regiment of the 19th Waffen Grenadier Division of the SS on the Volkhov Front. In 1944 Lobe was awarded the rank of colonel and commander of the infantry of the entire division, participating in fighting in the Opochka district and in Vidzeme. At the end of 1944 he was appointed as commander of Latvian construction battalion in Germany, but due to his Latvian nationalistic views was relieved of this command and placed before a German military tribunal. At the end of the war Lobe was interned in British zone of occupation for the period of a year.

=== Post-war ===
After the war, Lobe actively participated in the commune of Latvians in exile in Germany, such as the Hawks of Daugava organization. He continued this involvement after moving to Sweden in 1950. From 1954 until his death, Lobe was employed at the Military Archives of Sweden. He was an active participant in the Central Council of Latvians in Sweden. In 1970, Lobe unsuccessfully tried to sue the Swedish newspapers Ny Dag and Kvällsposten, after articles about his past as a Holocaust perpetrator and Nazi collaborator had been published in the newspapers. He died on 9 July 1985 in Österhaninge, south of Stockholm, Sweden.

Karlis Lobe married his wife Milda on 22 May 1922. She was born on 13 February 1898 and died on 31 May 1985 at Österhaninge, south of Stockholm, after 63 years of marriage.
