= Declaration on Latvian Legionnaires in World War II =

Declaration on Latvian Legionnaires in World War II (Latvian: Deklarācija par latviešu leģionāriem Otrajā pasaules karā) was adopted by the sixth Saeima in its second-to-last meeting on October 29, 1998. With Saeima composed of 100 MPs, 50 votes were cast in favour, 8 against. The rapporteur MP, Jānis Mauliņš, said before the vote, that "this decision will be our position towards our soldiers who truly fought for the independence of Latvia".

The declaration was answered with criticism by Russia's State Duma and by its foreign ministry.

In 2007, a draft of another declaration, revoking the 1998 declaration, was submitted to the Saeima. It was rejected, by 63 votes to 18.

In 2011, members of the Saeima from the National Alliance filed a question to the prime minister asking how the resolutive part of the declaration - "the Latvian government is obliged to do the following: 1) demand the occupying countries and their successors in title to observe international law and pay Latvian citizens, their family members and heirs compensation for losses incurred as a result of illegal impressment into the armies of the occupying countries; 2) prevent insults against the honour and dignity of Latvian soldiers in Latvia and abroad." - gets implemented.
