= Antra Liedskalniņa =

Latvian actress

- Born: 22 October 1930; Jaungulbene
- Died: 20 April 2000 (aged 69); Riga
- Occupation: Actress
- Years active: 1955–1999
- Children: Harijs Ozols

Antra Liedskalniņa (22 October 1930 – 20 April 2000) was a Latvian actress.

== Selected filmography ==
- I Remember Everything, Richard (1966)
- Pūt, vējiņi (1973)

== Theatre credits ==
Year	Production	Location	Role	Notes
1955	A Family Matter	Latvian National Theatre		
1969	A Streetcar Named Desire	Latvian National Theatre	Blanche	Directed by Alfrēds Jaunušans
