= Luftwaffen-Legion Lettland =

Nachtschlachtgruppe 12 (Lettisch) Luftwaffen-Legion Lettland
- Active: March – October 1944
- Country: Latvia
- Allegiance: Nazi Germany
- Branch: Luftwaffe
- Type: Nachtschlachtgruppe ("Night Combat Group")
- Role: Night harassment raids
- Size: 2 squadrons
- Engagements: World War II; Eastern Front

Insignia
- Squadron code: 6A
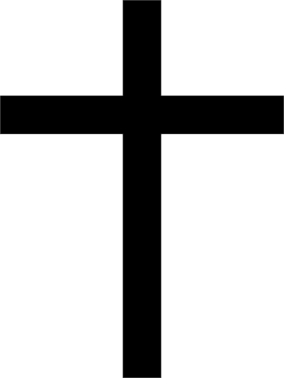
- Roundel

Aircraft flown
- Attack: Arado Ar 66; Gotha Go 145; Henschel Hs 126
- Trainer: Bücker Bü 131

Luftwaffen-Legion Lettland was a unit of the German Luftwaffe that served in the Eastern Front in 1944. It was composed almost entirely of Latvian volunteers.

== Unit history ==
=== Formation and training ===
In September 1943 the Germans ordered the creation of a Latvian night bombing unit as part of the Luftwaffe. A flight school, Flugzeugführerschule A/B Libau/Grobin, was established at Liepāja-Grobina in October, which was renamed Ergaenzungs Nachtschlachtgruppe Ostland ("Supplementary Night Combat Group Ostland") on 1 January 1944. The pilots were drawn from former members of the pre-war Latvian Army's Aviation Regiment, the paramilitary Aizsargi, and the Latvian Aero Club. Flying training was carried out in the Bücker Bü 131, and ground crews were trained as mechanics, electricians, ordnance handlers, and anti-aircraft gunners.

=== Nachtschlachtgruppe 12 (Lettisch) ===
The first group of pilots graduated in late February, and the 1st Staffel ("Squadron") of Nachtschlachtgruppe 12 (Lettisch), ("12th Night Combat Group (Latvian)") was established on 1 March 1944. It consisted of all Latvian officer and NCO pilots, ground crews, with a few German liaison and administrative personnel, and was equipped with eighteen Arado Ar 66 biplanes, all under the command of a German, Hauptmann Rademacher.

As a Störkampfstaffel ("Harassment squadron") 1./NSGr.12 flew night bombing missions attacking enemy concentrations, infrastructure, and other targets of opportunity. Although the Ar 66 was a two-seater aircraft, they usually flew with only a single pilot, and carried two or three 50 kg (110 lb) or 70 kg (150 lb) anti-personnel or incendiary bombs. Their missions were typically flown at an altitude of around 1,000 m (3,300 ft), up to 50 km (31 mi) behind enemy lines. Each pilot was issued with a pistol and machine gun, in case of a forced landing in enemy territory.

1./NSGr.12 were first based at Vecumi, flying their first combat missions on 26 March. On 26 May they moved to Salas aerodrome in Kārsava, about 50 km (31 mi) south of Vecumi. On 22 June the second Staffel (2./NSGr.12) was formed, joining 1./NSGr.12 at Salas on the 26th. In July NSGr.12 moved north-east to Gulbene, and later eastwards to Kalnciems near Riga. A third Staffel (3./NSGr.12) was created in July, but due to a lack of aircraft, flew no operations, and its equipment and personnel were eventually incorporated into the 1st and 2nd Staffeln.

=== Luftwaffen-Legion Lettland ===
On 11 August 1944 the Luftwaffen-Legion Lettland ("Air Force Legion Latvia") was formed. It consisted of the two active Staffel of NSGr.12, and the third (still in the process of formation), the flight school at Liepāja-Grobina, renamed the Ergaenzungs Fliegergruppe Lettland ("Latvian Supplementary Flying Group"), and an anti-aircraft unit. On 17 August overall command of the Legion was assumed by the Latvian Lieutenant-Colonel Jānis Rucels, with Lt.-Col. Nikolajs Bulmanis commanding NSGr.12. In September the Legion was relocated further east to a base in Tukums, and in early October flew their last combat sorties in the vicinity of Dobele. The Legion was finally evacuated back to Hohensalza (now Inowrocław, Poland).

The trust of the Germans in their local Baltic flyers had been eroded by the desertion of five Estonian pilots from Nachtschlachtgruppe 11 (Estnisch) to neutral Sweden in late September and early October. As a result, the Luftwaffe ordered that the Estonian and Latvian aviation legions be dissolved. Luftwaffen-Legion Lettland was disbanded on 17 October 1944, and its personnel redistributed to German units.

During its operational existence the unit flew about 6,150 sorties, with the loss of six pilots. About 80% of the pilots were awarded the Iron Cross 1st or 2nd class.

In mid-1944 a select group of ten Latvian pilots were transferred to Germany to train in the Focke-Wulf Fw 190. Five returned to Latvia in October, but by then the Legion had been disbanded, so they were assigned to Jagdgeschwader 54.

== See also ==
- Latvian Legion
- Night Witches
