= Amnesty of SS Legionnaires in the USSR =

General pardon of former SS servicemen

The Amnesty of SS Legionnaires was a general pardon of former Nazi Schutzstaffel (SS) servicemen, returning Latvians, Estonians and Lithuanians to their homeland, pursuant to Resolution of the Council of Ministers of the USSR No. 843-342ss of April 13, 1946, "On the return of repatriated Latvians, Estonians and Lithuanians". This amnesty was the first in a series of actions by the Soviet leadership upon repatriated, interned and other Soviet citizens who collaborated with the German administration during the World War 2. The number of released collaborators from the Baltic states amounted to 44169 people, including 6507 Estonians, 30,824 Latvians and 6838 Lithuanians. The sending of these people to their homeland began in June 1946 and ended by the summer of 1947.

The amnesty of the Baltic collaborators was unprecedented in relation to Soviet citizens who collaborated with the Nazi government or served in the ranks of its armed formations. The only analog is the resolution of the USSR Council of Ministers of October 2, 1946 "On the return of repatriated Georgians, Armenians and Azerbaijanis to their homeland," which, however, did not apply to "persons who served in the German army, legionnaires, Vlasov soldiers and policemen."

== Baltic formations in the service of the Third Reich ==
During the German occupation of the Latvian, Estonian and Lithuanian Soviet Socialist Republics, many police and military formations were created in these territories, which in the second half of the Great Patriotic War became the base for the national legions created in Latvia and Estonia. Most of the military personnel joined the banner of the Third Reich in Latvia: a total of 115 thousand. Estonia gave about 30 thousand, Lithuania 26 thousand.

Russian historian S. I. Drobiazko estimated that up to 300,000 residents of the Baltic republics served in the Wehrmacht, SS troops, police and paramilitary forces, which is 6.3% of the total population, which is much higher than in the Slavic republics, where the number of collaborators is estimated at 700,000 people, or 0.5% of the population. Even before the formation of the legions, auxiliary police units formed from the Balts participated in punitive operations against the civilian population of Russia and Belarus, guarded concentration camps (from Leningrad to Stalingrad region), and participated in combat operations against the Red Army.

After the victory over Nazi Germany, some of the Baltic soldiers of the Reich were captured by the Allies, about 40 thousand were captured by the Red Army, of which 28 thousand were fighters of the Latvian Legion, who were surrounded in the Courland pocket. The ratio of military personnel and "displaced persons" from the Baltic States who found themselves in the area of action of the other Allies corresponded to the general situation: 3/5 (more than 3 million people in total) ended up in the western zone (West Germany, France, Italy, etc.), 2/5 (less than 2 million people) in the eastern (East Germany, Poland, Czechoslovakia, etc.).

== Trial of the collaborators ==
The basic principles of punishment for accomplices of the Nazi authorities were stipulated by the order of the NKVD of the USSR No. 001683 dated December 12, 1941, and then supplemented by the instructions of the NKVD of the USSR dated February 18, 1942: such people were to be arrested and tried. On April 19, 1943 The Presidium of the Supreme Soviet of the USSR adopted a decree that toughened the penalties for those involved in the killings and torture of Soviet prisoners of war and civilians, who, like Nazi criminals, faced the death penalty by hanging. The joint NKVD and NKGB Directive No. 494/94 of September 11, 1943 provided for the arrest of officers of collaborationist formations, soldiers who participated in punitive operations against civilians, defectors from the Red Army, burgermeisters, senior officials, Gestapo and Abwehr agents, as well as those from village elders who collaborated with German counterintelligence. At the same time, punishments for persons not involved in war crimes were commuted: military personnel of military age were sent to screening and filtration camps, where they were checked under the same conditions as Red Army soldiers and prisoners of war who had escaped the encirclements, and those of non-military age were left at their place of residence under the supervision of the NKGB.

After the Victory, the Soviet leadership had to determine the fate of millions of fellow citizens who found themselves in enemy territory for various reasons: as ostarbeiters, concentration camp prisoners, prisoners of war, as well as those who left with the German troops voluntarily. It was decided to send the latter to screening and filtration camps to be checked for war crimes, which most of the collaborators passed successfully.

The legionnaires captured by the Red Army, according to the Decree of the State Defense Committee of August 18, 1945 No. 9871c and the Decree of the Council of People's Commissars of the USSR of December 21, 1945 No. 3141-950cc concerning persons who served in enemy armies, "treasonable formations", police, etc., were sent for resettlement in the northern regions of the USSR for a period of 6 years along with Vlasov and other collaborators. "Such a decision was a real salvation for these people, since according to Article 193 of the then Criminal Code of the RSFSR, only one punishment was provided for military personnel who defected to the enemy in wartime — the death penalty with confiscation of property," notes historian Victor Zemskov. The adopted resolution of August 18 effectively freed the collaborators from criminal liability. "During 1952-1955, these individuals were gradually released from the special settlement," adds Zemskov, but the collaborators from the Baltic republics were actually amnestied even earlier.

However, on March 3, 1946, the directive of the People's Commissar of Internal Affairs of the USSR No. 54 appeared, which provided for:

"1. All Latvians, Estonians and Lithuanians who are in the screening and filtration camps of the NKVD of the USSR, who after verification will be fully rehabilitated and are subject to release from the camps, are to be sent to the place of residence of their families, respectively, in the Latvian SSR, Lithuanian SSR and Estonian SSR. 2. Not subject to return to their homeland: a) those working in camps serving enterprises for which there are special government decisions on the transfer of a verified contingent to this industry; b) those subject to transfer to the areas of settlement in accordance with government decisions".

Civilian repatriates from the Baltic States were not subject to conscription into the army and labor battalions, and repatriated Baltic collaborators were supposed to be sent to a special settlement, but they would be also released soon.

== Letter by the Latvian leadership ==
On March 16, 1946, the first secretary of the Communist Party of Latvia, Jānis Kalnbērziņš, and the head of government, Vilis Lācis, sent a letter to the Deputy Chairman of the Soviet government, Vyacheslav Molotov, in which they put forward the thesis about the forced mobilization of their compatriots into the Latvian Legion and that the Latvians had evaded service in every possible way, and therefore, with their imprisonment after the war, "a large number of families of the citizens of the Latvian SSR lost their breadwinners. On this basis, the remaining relatives, who, for the most part, are elderly, women and children, developed a depressed mood, which was acutely manifested at all pre-election meetings during the election campaign to the Supreme Council and still continues to greatly worry the remaining numerous relatives. Considering that the sending of former legionnaires into the interior of the country caused negative sentiments among the Latvian population and taking into account that the Latvian SSR is in great need of labor… as well as that the so-called Legionnaires were conscripted into the German army by force, and some of them were conscripted right from school, and all of them were in Soviet Latvia for only about a year (1940-1941) and during that time could not be properly affected by Soviet inflience, We ask you to reconsider the issue of former legionnaires, who are guilty in nothing else but service in the legions,— not to settle them in the northern regions of the USSR, but to return to the Latvian SSR to their families and farms".

The initiative to seek an amnesty for legionnaires fell on the shoulders of the Latvian leaders, since of the 40,000 captured Nazi collaborators, 28,000 were representatives of the Latvian SSR.

Molotov sent a letter to Lavrentiy Beria and Interior Minister Sergei Kruglov. They promptly considered the issue. Kruglov proposed to allow all Latvians of non-military age to return to their place of residence, and to send Latvians of military age to construction and industry work in the republic. In addition, he suggested a similar approach for residents of Estonia and Lithuania. A corresponding decision was prepared less than a month later, and on April 13, Resolution of the Council of Ministers of the USSR No. 843-342ss "On the return of repatriated Latvians, Estonians and Lithuanians" was adopted.

The mechanism for the release of the Baltic collaborators was specified in Directive No. 00336 of the USSR Ministry of Internal Affairs dated April 19, 1946. A characteristic feature of Directive No. 00336 was the release of not only the rank and file, but also officers, while the command staff of the Russian ROA were to be sent to GULAG correctional labor camps.

== The essence of the resolution ==
The decision of the Government of the USSR stipulated that throughout 1946, former legionnaires of Latvian, Estonian and Lithuanian nationalities were to be released and returned to their homeland in the following order:

"a) all persons of military age, whose peers have not been demobilized, should be sent, respectively, in coordination with the Gosplan, in an organized way to work in industry and construction in the Latvian, Estonian and Lithuanian SSR, with their assignment to these jobs until the end of the demobilization of their peers from the Red Army; b) all persons of non-military age whose peers are not in the Red Army should be released and sent to their families' place of permanent residence."

The decision also applied to those legionnaires who were repatriated to the Soviet Union from the West. Thus, the Soviet government placed former ethnic Latvian, Estonian, and Lithuanian collaborators in a privileged position compared, for example, to those Russians who, after being captured and living in the West, nevertheless decided to return home and were arrested immediately upon arrival. If Legionnaires were arrested, it was based on accumulated investigative documents, evidence, or witness statements about war crimes months or even years later. In addition, the decree did not affect the legion's servicemen of other nationalities, who were released only under the 1953 amnesty.

== Implementation of the resolution ==
The implementation of the decision began in mid-June 1946 and was supposed to be completed in December of the same year. However, in the process of implementing Directive No. 00336, it was adjusted. Firstly, by Resolution of the Council of Ministers of the USSR No. 1626-718ss dated August 27, 1946, Baltic soldiers of military age of all nationalities were sent to work at the USSR Ministry of Internal Affairs Combine No. 7, which extracted uranium. Secondly, in September 1946, at the request of the Minister of Coal Industry, Vakhrushev, it was allowed to detain workers of Baltic origin employed in the mines of the Urals and Kuzbass until the end of the year.

In early October 1946, the USSR Ministry of Internal Affairs calculated the number of repatriated collaborators from the Baltic States being released: 44,169 people, including 6507 Estonians, 30,824 Latvians and 6838 Lithuanians. Their transportation to their homeland was delayed: by September 20, 9,069 people had been sent, including 621 to Estonia, 7,396 to Latvia and 1,052 to Lithuania. By November 1, the number of those sent had increased to 14,969, including 5,611 to industry and 9,358 to their place of residence. By December 10, more than half of the planned people had left for their homeland: 26,599, including 10,691 for industry, and 15,908 for their place of residence.

The complete release of the Baltic collaborators was completed by mid-1947. On June 12, 1947, the Council of Ministers of the USSR extended, with some reservations, the decree of April 13, 1946, to persons of other nationalities (except Germans) who were natives and permanent residents of Lithuania, Latvia and Estonia.
