= Voldemar Damberg =

Soviet Army major general

Voldemar Frantsevich Damberg
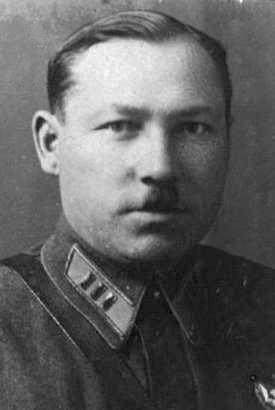
- Damberg in the late 1930s
- Born: 14 November 1899; Riga, Russian Empire
- Died: 8 August 1965 (aged 65); Riga, Soviet Union
- Military career
- Allegiance: Russian Empire; Soviet Union
- Branch: Imperial Russian Army; Red Army
- Service years: 1916–1917; 1918–1938; 1939–1959
- Rank: Major general
- Commands: 15th Cavalry Corps; 124th Rifle Corps; 48th Rifle Division; 308th Rifle Division; 43rd Guards Rifle Division
- Conflicts: World War I; Russian Civil War; World War II
- Awards: Order of the Red Banner

Voldemar Frantsevich Damberg (Russian: Вольдемар Францевич Дамберг, Latvian: Voldemārs Dambergs; 14 November 1899 – 8 August 1965) was a Soviet Army major general. Of Latvian ethnicity, Damberg rose to corps command during World War II.

A factory worker, Damberg briefly served as a Latvian Rifleman during World War I and rose to cavalry squadron commander in the Red Army during the Russian Civil War. Damberg continued to serve in cavalry units and was arrested during the Great Purge. Restored to the army, Damberg held corps command with the Soviet troops in Iran and the Transcaucasus. During 1944 and 1945 he served as a corps commander, division commander and deputy corps commander in the Baltic. He continued to command Latvian army units and ended his career in the 1950s as military commissar of the Latvian Soviet Socialist Republic.

== Early life, World War I and Russian Civil War ==
A Latvian, Voldemar Frantsevich Damberg was born on 14 November 1899 in Riga. After the evacuation of the Salamandra factory from Riga in July 1915 during World War I, he worked as a metalworker at the Zhiguli factory in Samara and as a blacksmith's striker at the Samara Military Workshops. At the end of that year he departed to Perm, where he worked at a branch of the former Salamandra factory, and four months later moved to the Lessner factory to work as an assistant metalworker. At the end of 1916, Damberg went to the Western Front to join his older brother in the Imperial Russian Army. On arrival in December 1916, he joined the 2nd Latvian Rifle Regiment as a ryadovoy. After the February Revolution in March 1917, he deserted and returned to Perm where he returned to his previous job.

In July of that year, Damberg joined a workers' detachment, which was merged into the Red Guard detachment of the Motovilikha factory. With the detachment, Damberg fought against the Whites on the Ural Front as the Russian Civil War began. In April 1918 he transferred to the Red Army and became a Red Army man in the 1st Latvian Cavalry Regiment, and from June served as chairman of the committee and commissar of the 2nd Latvian Cavalry Battalion. Damberg was enrolled as a student in the School of the Army of Soviet Latvia in April 1919, but did not graduate. When the school was sent to the front in June he was appointed chief of a cavalry detachment. In May the school was disbanded near Sebezh, but Damberg was sent with a group of cadets to the 1st Moscow Cavalry Courses. After completing the courses in October, he commanded a platoon of the 1st Cavalry Regiment of the Separate Cavalry Brigade of the Western Front. For carrying the wounded commander of the regiment's 2nd Squadron off the battlefield, Damberg was awarded the Order of the Red Banner. After the expansion of the brigade into the 15th Cavalry Division and the redesignation of the regiment to the 85th Cavalry Regiment, Damberg continued to serve with the regiment as its commissar and as a squadron commander. In May 1920 he was sent to the Higher Cavalry School in Petrograd for further training.

== Interwar period ==
Damberg graduated from the school in August 1922, and was assigned to the Bashkir Command Courses at Ufa as chief of its cavalry department. From May 1923 he was an assistant squadron commander at the Orenburg Cavalry School, and from October 1924 commander of the separate cavalry squadron of the 57th Ural Rifle Division. From June 1927 he served as chief of staff of the 48th Cavalry Regiment of the 8th Orenburg Cavalry Division, and during that year temporarily commanded the regiment. In October 1928 he was admitted to the preparatory department of the Frunze Military Academy, and a year later transferred to its special department.

Upon graduation in May 1932, Damberg was appointed chief of the 1st section of the staff of the 10th North Caucasus Cavalry Division. He rose to chief of staff of the 11th Cavalry Division in January 1934. In March 1938, then-Colonel Damberg was expelled from the Communist Party during the Great Purge for ties to an "enemy of the people." He was dismissed from the army, arrested by the NKVD on 14 July and imprisoned on fabricated charges. Damberg was freed on 6 December and after being restored to the army in February 1939 appointed an instructor in the general tactics department of the Frunze Military Academy. In January 1941 he was transferred to serve as assistant commander of the 24th Cavalry Division of the Transcaucasus Military District.

== World War II ==
Shortly after Germany invaded the Soviet Union, Damberg was appointed commander of the 28th Reserve Rifle Brigade on 6 July. From May 1942 he served as deputy commander of the 15th Cavalry Corps of the Transcaucasus Front, stationed in Iran as part of the Soviet occupation forces there. Damberg temporarily commanded the corps between 16 October and 11 January 1943. In February 1943 he was appointed commander of the 13th Rifle Corps, which briefly saw action in the Battle of the Caucasus. Damberg was promoted to the rank of major general on 31 March 1943. In January 1944 he was transferred to command the 124th Rifle Corps, whose headquarters was forming at Lyubertsy in the Moscow Military District. After completing its formation the corps was assigned to the 54th Army of the Volkhov Front, assigned divisions and took part in the Leningrad–Novgorod offensive. Damberg was wounded on 27 February and remained in the hospital until 20 March, then was appointed commander of the 48th Rifle Division of the Leningrad Front.

In July he was transferred to command the 308th Latvian Rifle Division, forming in the Gorokhovets camps in the Moscow Military District. In the second half of June, the 308th was relocated to Nevel, where it was assigned to the 22nd Army of the 2nd Baltic Front. The division took part in the Madona offensive and the battles for Krustpils. Subsequently, crossing the Aiviekste river, its units took part in the Riga offensive. Damberg was promoted to deputy commander of the 130th Latvian Rifle Corps in October. Until the end of the war, the corps blockaded the Courland Pocket. After the end of the war, corps commander Detlavs Brantkalns recommended him for the Order of Suvorov, 2nd class, but this was downgraded to the Order of the Patriotic War, 1st class, which Damberg was awarded on 6 June 1945. The citation read:

Major General Comrade Damberg has been deputy commander of the corps since 2 October 1944, appointed from the position of commander of the 308th Latvian Rifle Division.

While commanding the 308th Latvian Rifle Division he showed skill directing the units of the division in battle. With this division Major General Comrade Damberg went through all the battles on the territory of the Latvian SSR until the taking of the city of Riga. In battles on the territory of the Latvian SSR for Krustpils, during the forcing of the Aiviekste river and subsequent battles on the approaches to Riga he skillfully directed the units of the division in battle, ensuring combined arms cooperation as a result of which the assigned objectives were accomplished, and the division under his command was awarded the state award Order of the Red Banner.

While deputy commander of the corps he worked an exceptional amount of work on the combat training of personnel, and in the battles for the elimination of the Courland group of the Germans from 23 December 1944 carried out independent tasks, directing elements of the corps in battle.

In the subsequent offensive battles of the corps from 5 to 8 May 1945 he directly led the offensive operations of the 308th Latvian Red Banner Rifle Division, excellently organized the conduct of combat operations, displaying urgency and decisiveness. In these actions he displayed courage and valor, which ensured the general success of the units of the corps in the offensive and inflicted heavy losses on the enemy in equipment and personnel.

For his exemplary fulfillment of combat objectives of the command for the destruction of the German-Fascist invaders on the approaches to Riga and in the battles for the liberation of Courland, personal bravery and courage, he is deserving of the state award of the Order of Suvorov, second class.

== Postwar ==
After the end of the war, Damberg continued to serve as corps deputy commander in the Baltic Military District. In December 1945 he returned to command of the 308th Latvian Rifle Division, and in April 1946 took command of the 130th Latvian Rifle Corps. In July he was appointed commander of the 43rd Guards Latvian Rifle Division, which was reorganized into the 29th Separate Guards Latvian Rifle Brigade on 4 April 1947. The brigade was expanded back into the 43rd Guards Latvian Rifle Division in June 1950. Damberg was dismissed from command in April 1952 due to illness and in June of that year appointed military commissar of the Republic Military Commissariat of the Latvian Soviet Socialist Republic. He was retired on 10 April 1959 due to illness, and died in Riga on 8 August 1965.

== Awards ==
Damberg was a recipient of the following awards and decorations:

- Order of Lenin
- Order of the Red Banner (4)
- Order of the Patriotic War, 1st class
- Order of the Red Star
- Medals
