= 201st Guards Military Base =

Motor rifle division of the Russian military

201st Rifle Division (I Formation) 1941–1942 (converted to 43rd Guards Rifle Division) 201st Rifle Division (II Formation) 1943 – c. 1945 325th Rifle Brigade c. 1945 – 1948 27th Mountain Rifle Division 1948–1957 124th Motor Rifle Division 1957–1965 201st Motor Rifle Division 1965–2004 201st Military Base (2004–present)
- 201-я российская военная база
- Shoulder sleeve patch
- Active: 1941–present
- Country: Soviet Union (until 1991); Russia
- Branch: Soviet Army (until 1991); Russian Ground Forces
- Type: Military base
- Role: Security
- Part of: Central Military District
- Garrison/HQ: Tajikistan, Dushanbe
- Engagements: World War II; Battle of Moscow; Siege of Leningrad; Operation Bagration; Soviet–Afghan War; Tajikistani Civil War; Russo-Ukrainian war (2022–present); Pokrovsk offensive
- Decorations: Guards; Order of the Red Banner (2); Order of Zhukov
- Battle honours: Gatchina

The 201st Guards Gatchina twice Red Banner, Order of Zhukov Military Base (Tajik: Пойгоҳи низомии 201-и; Russian: 201-я гвардейская Гатчинская дважды Краснознамённая, ордена Жукова военная база) is a Russian military base based in Dushanbe, Tajikistan, part of the Central Military District. It was originally raised twice in World War II as part of the Soviet Union's Red Army and is now part of the Russian Ground Forces.

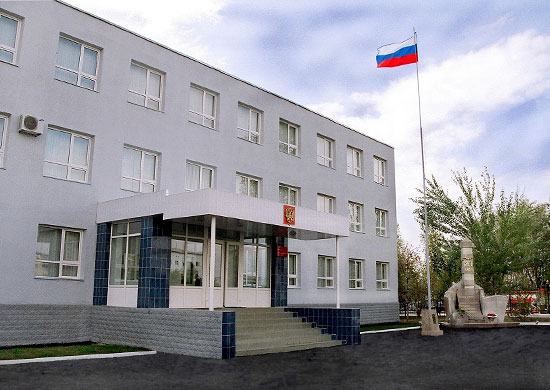
The headquarters of the base.

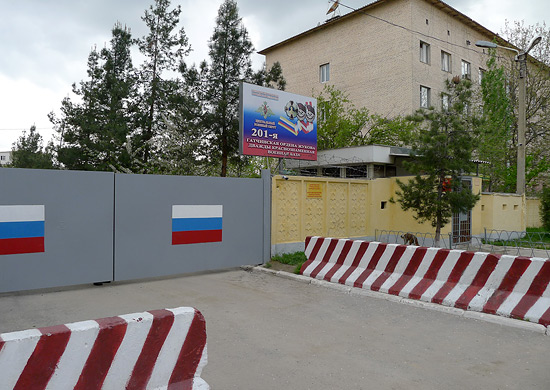
Gate of the base.

== The Great Patriotic War ==
=== 201st Rifle Division (first formation) ===
The division was formed as Red Army national unit on 3 August 1941 in Gorokhovets, Vladimir Oblast, Moscow Military District from remains of the 24th Territorial Rifle Corps. It was originally designated as the 201st Latvian Rifle Division, the first of three "national" divisions of the recently occupied Baltic states by the Soviets. The basis of the division was the 76th Independent Latvian Rifle Regiment which was in turn formed from the two Latvian volunteer battalions that participated in the retreats of the Red Army, including the defence of Tallinn. It had been established in August 1941 at Gorki (today Nizhny Novgorod) Gorokhovetz Army Camp. In addition to the much depleted 76th regiment (about 1200 troops), were added 2500 Latvian speaking members of the state militia (police) and NKVD, as well as the predominantly Latvian speaking 582nd Construction Battalion, and members of the 24th Corps which was the territorial reserve formation in Latvia which failed to form due to rapid German advance.

At this time the composition of the division included the 92nd, 122nd and 191st Rifle Regiments, 220th Artillery Regiment, 10th Independent AAA Battery, 170th Independent Signals Battalion, and other support units. By December 1941 the division had 10,348 personnel, of whom 51% were ethnic Latvians, 26% ethnic Russians, 17% Jews and 6% others. This caused some problems since most Jews spoke Yiddish only, and the Latvians published the divisional paper Latvijas strēlnieks (Latvian Rifleman) in Latvian. At least 70 Jewish members of the division were members of the Zionist Beitar organisation that had been training members for travel to the then Palestine to defend Jewish settlements there before Latvia was annexed by Soviet Union.

The first combat the division experienced was during the counter-offensive at Moscow in the areas of Naro-Fominsk and Borovsk where it suffered 55% casualties. By June 1942 only 36% of the division were Latvian-speaking, and a year later this figure was reduced to 32%. However, in part this was due to the formation of a second Latvian division, the 308th Latvian Rifle Division. The division was reflagged as the 43rd Guards Rifle Division in October 1942.

The division joined in combat for Moscow (from 20 December 1941 until 20 January 1942), for Staraya Russa (from 16 February 1942 until 4 April), Demjansk bridgehead (from 6 April 1942 until 9 April 1943; see also Demyansk Shield); from 10 April 1943 until 15 October the division was in Staraya Russa region, from 18 October 1943 until 26 June 1944 in Velikiye Luki and Novorzhev region. From 26 June 1944 until 11 July the division was included with the 130th Latvian Riflemen Corps until crossing the Latvian border (22nd Army). From 18 July 1944 Šķaune region and joined combat on Latvian soil on 7 November 1944.

The division also included other Latvian citizens who were behind the Soviet front line and a large number of Russia's Latvians. Beginning strength was about 2,100 men. In September 1941 the division had about 10,000 men. The division contained the 92nd, 122nd and 191st Rifle Regiments and 220th Artillery Regiment. On 5 October 1942 it became the 43rd Latvian Guard Riflemen Division. Regiments assigned to this division were the 121st, 123rd, and 125th Guard Rifle Regiments and the 94th Guard Artillery Regiment, the 270th Artillery Battalion which was renamed to the 55th Guard Artillery Battalion, the 48th Guard Antitank Artillery Battalion, the 100th Antiaircraft Battery which was renamed to the 44th Guard Antiaircraft Battery, the 53rd Sapper Battalion which was renamed to the 47th Guard Sapper Battalion. The division was commanded by Guard Major General Jānis Veikins, Regiment Commander L. Paegle, Regiment Commander A. Frolovs, Guard Major General Detlavs Brantkalns and Alfrēds Kalniņš.

=== 201st Rifle Division (2nd formation) ===
Border detachments of the People's Commissariat for Internal Affairs (the NKVD) had been resisting the Finnish advance from June 22, 1941. On September 21, 1941, the combined detachment of Border Guards, including the 3rd Border Guard Detachment, became a separate rifle brigade of the NKVD Border Troops by 23rd Army Headquarters Order No. 88. On August 14, 1942, in pursuance of the Decree of the State Defense Committee of the USSR No. 2100-ss, dated July 26, 1942,, directives of the headquarters of the Leningrad Front No. 1/18949 of July 30, 1942, and the headquarters of the 23rd Army No. 001002 of August 5, 1942, the separate rifle brigade of the border troops of the NKVD guarding the rear of the Leningrad Front was transferred to the Red Army and reorganized into the 27th separate rifle brigade in accordance with Shtat No. 04/330 - 04/342.

The 201st Rifle Division was formed in accordance with the directive of the commander of the Leningrad Front, General of the Army L.A. Govorov No. 1/15885 of May 25, 1943. The formation of the division took place north of Leningrad in the village of Lekhtusi (Finnish: Lehtoinkylä, Lehtusi) combining the 27th Independent Rifle Brigade and the 13th Brigade of the defence forces of Leningrad. Another report says the brigade was raised at Shlisselburg, near Leningrad, in November 1943 within the 23rd Army.

It served in the Leningrad and Baltic coast areas. Aside from the usual components of the rifle division in 1943, the division also had a separate battalion equipped with snow skis, and each regiment had a snow ski equipped company to serve as advance detachments. In September the division was transferred to the 3rd Army. The initial composition of the division included:

- 92nd Rifle Regiment (former 3rd, 5th, 33rd and 102nd Border Guard detachments from the Karelian peninsula Border Guard Brigade)
- 122nd Rifle Regiment (former 13th Leningrad Internal Security Brigade)
- 191st Rifle Regiment (was created from detachments of a naval infantry brigade of the Baltic Fleet)
- 220th Artillery Regiment
- 256th Separate Communications Battalion
- 119th Separate Reconnaissance Company
- 122nd Separate Reconnaissance Company(ski)
- 198th Separate Anti-Tank Division
- 51st Separate Sapper Battalion
- 53rd Separate Sapper Battalion
- 49th Separate Medical-Sanitary Battalion
- 20th Separate Auto-Delivery Company
- 136th Separate Chemical Company

The division's first commander was Colonel Vyacheslav Petrovich Yakutovich.

In January 1944 the division was assigned to the 122nd Rifle Corps. The division received the title Gatchina for its role in breaking the siege of Leningrad and received its first Order of the Red Banner during the war. Following the relief of the siege the division incorporated several partisan detachments and groups which were used to strengthen the reconnaissance and ski equipped units. In February the division was transferred to the 117th Rifle Corps, and soon after was awarded the Order of the Red Banner for the capturing of Luga.

In June 1944 the division was serving with the 8th Army before moving to participate in the assault on Narva, for which the 191st regiment was awarded the honorific Narvsky. On 5 August 1944 the division was transferred to the 2nd Shock Army, and participated in the battles to break the Panther Line, after which it was withdrawn for a brief reconstitution, and a movement by train to the Pskov area of operations with the rest of the army. During the further battles in the Baltic republics the 191st Rifle Regiment was awarded the Order of Alexander Nevsky for destroying the German 23rd Infantry Regiment (12th Infantry Division) and two Latvian SS battalions. In the process of these battles the 1st and 2nd Battalions of the regiment at one time were reduced to 20–30 men while the 3rd Battalion ceased to exist. In October 1944 the division participated in the Soviet re-occupation of Riga after which the division was transferred to the 1st Baltic Front and participated in the containment of the Courland encirclement of Wehrmacht forces. From March 1945 the division was in the 1st Rifle Corps of the 1st Shock Army of the Kurland Group (Leningrad Front). However, by May 1945 it had joined the 119th Rifle Corps. On 1 October 1945 the division completed its movement to Dushanbe in Tajikistan.

== Cold War and post-independence ==
=== Post-war ===
Following post-war reductions, the division was reflagged as the 325th Rifle Brigade, but in 1948 was again reflagged as the 27th Mountain Rifle Division. It remained within 119th Rifle Corps through the corps' redesignation as 33rd Rifle Corps in 1955 and then 33rd Army Corps in 1957. As a mountain division, it included receiving pack mountain 75 mm guns for its artillery regiment that were of the 1905 model with their manufacturer's plate stating they were manufactured in St. Petersburg. In 1958, following post-Stalinist reforms, the division was reduced to the 451st Mountain Rifle Regiment, but in the next year it was reformed albeit as the 124th Motor Rifle Division (cadre, about fifteen per cent strong), including the 401st Tank Regiment. It reverted to the 201st Gatchina Motor Rifle Division in 1965. From 1960 the division's artillery regiment was the 998th Artillery Regiment Starokonstantinovsky, which later became a self-propelled regiment. In the 1960s the division also received the 1098th Anti-Aircraft Missile Regiment.

The first military parade in Stalinabad took place with the participation of the 201st Rifle Division took place on 7 November 1945.

In 1968 the 33rd Army Corps moved to Kemerovo in the Siberian Military District and thus the 201st MRD joined the 17th Army Corps with its headquarters at Dushanbe.

=== Afghanistan ===
As part of the Central Asian Military District, the division participated in the invasion of Afghanistan in December 1979, when it entered Afghanistan with the 40th Army.

In the 191st Motor Rifle Regiment of the "framed" (reduced-strength) division at the beginning of December 1979, there were 12 (twelve) people (the regiment was held at a state “G” strength). In connection with the deployment of the regiment to Afghanistan, in January 1980, the regiment's personnel were quickly increased to 2,200 people.

It was stationed in Kunduz province. At this time the division lost the 92nd Motor Rifle Regiment, left behind in Dushanbe to become part of the replacement 134th Motor Rifle Division, and the 191st Motor Rifle Regiment, which was detached under the direct control of the 40th Army as the 191st Separate Motor Rifle Regiment, garrisoned southeast of Ghazni. The division gained the 149th Guards Chenstokhova Motor Rifle Regiment of the 128th Guards Motor Rifle Division and the 395th Motor Rifle Regiment of the 3rd Guards Motor Rifle Division. The division headquarters, the 220th Artillery Regiment, 149th Guards and other smaller units were stationed in Kunduz, while the 122nd MRR was based in Tashkurgan and the 395th MRR in Puli-Khumri. The tank regiment remained in Samarkand and was replaced by the 285th Tank Regiment from the 60th Tank Division.

During its service in Afghanistan the division largely coordinated its operations with the Afghan Army's 18th (Mazar-i-Sharif) and 20th (Baglan) Infantry Divisions, as well as the 10th and 31st Infantry Regiments.

In 1985, the division received a second Order of the Red Banner. The division used BMP-1 and BMP-2 infantry fighting vehicles, BTR-60 and BTR-70 armoured personnel carriers, T-62 tanks and Gvozdika 122mm self-propelled guns. The last Soviet vehicle to leave Afghanistan on 15 February 1989 was a BTR-60 from the 201st. The BTR-60 is still kept to the present day as a memorial.

Following its withdrawal, the 191st MRR was returned to the division, while it retained the 149th Guards MRR.

=== The Tajik Civil War ===
At the time the Soviet Union collapsed in 1991, the 201st was stationed in Tajikistan. Newly independent Tajikistan fell apart in 1992 – the Tajikistan Civil War. Most of the conscripts were raised in Tajikistan and deserted while the Russian officers kept control of the division’s equipment after its subunits were reinforced with Russian spetsnaz troops. In September 1992, Russian President Yeltsin reinstated the division under firm Russian control. The CIS formed the Collective Peacekeeping Force in Tajikistan, and the 201st formed its core.

The 201st Motor Rifle Division, with the support of loyal Tajik forces, attacked Dushanbe. Russian and Tajik force entered and seized control of the city in December 1992. After the capital was recaptured, offensives were launched in Kofarnikhon and Kurgan-Tyube. Both cities fell quickly and the major concentrations of Islamist rebels were scattered. However, in 1995, Islamist insurgents assaulted one of the bases of the 201st in Gorno-Badakhshan Autonomous Region and ambushed a convoy near Kalashum, 200 km east of Dushanbe. The division launched a counterattack supported by ground attack aircraft and attack helicopters. On April 19, the 201st launched an offensive into Gorno-Badach and advanced 20 kilometres, forcing the Islamists out of several bases.

In 1996 the division's sapper battalion participated in border region mine clearance operations with Tajikistan forces.

In 2001 the division was deployed to the Afghanistan border in expectation of the US attack on Afghanistan, and possible attempts by the Taliban to cross the border into Tajikistan.

== 2003–present ==
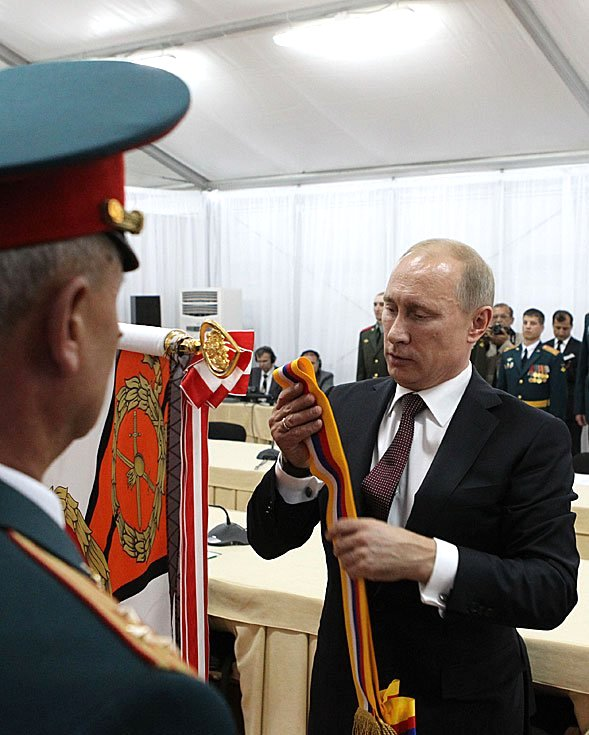
President of Russia Vladimir Putin presenting the base with the Order of Zhukov in the course of a visit on 5 October 2012

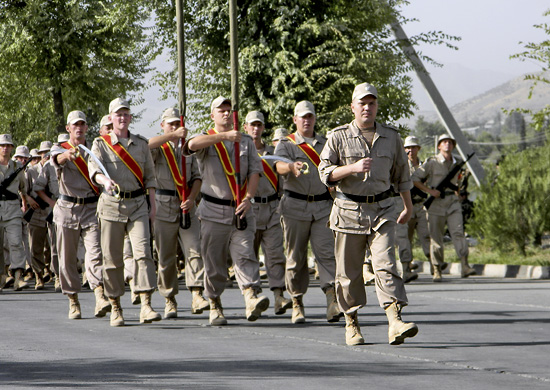
Russian soldiers from the base at the general rehearsal of a military parade in Dushanbe in 2011.

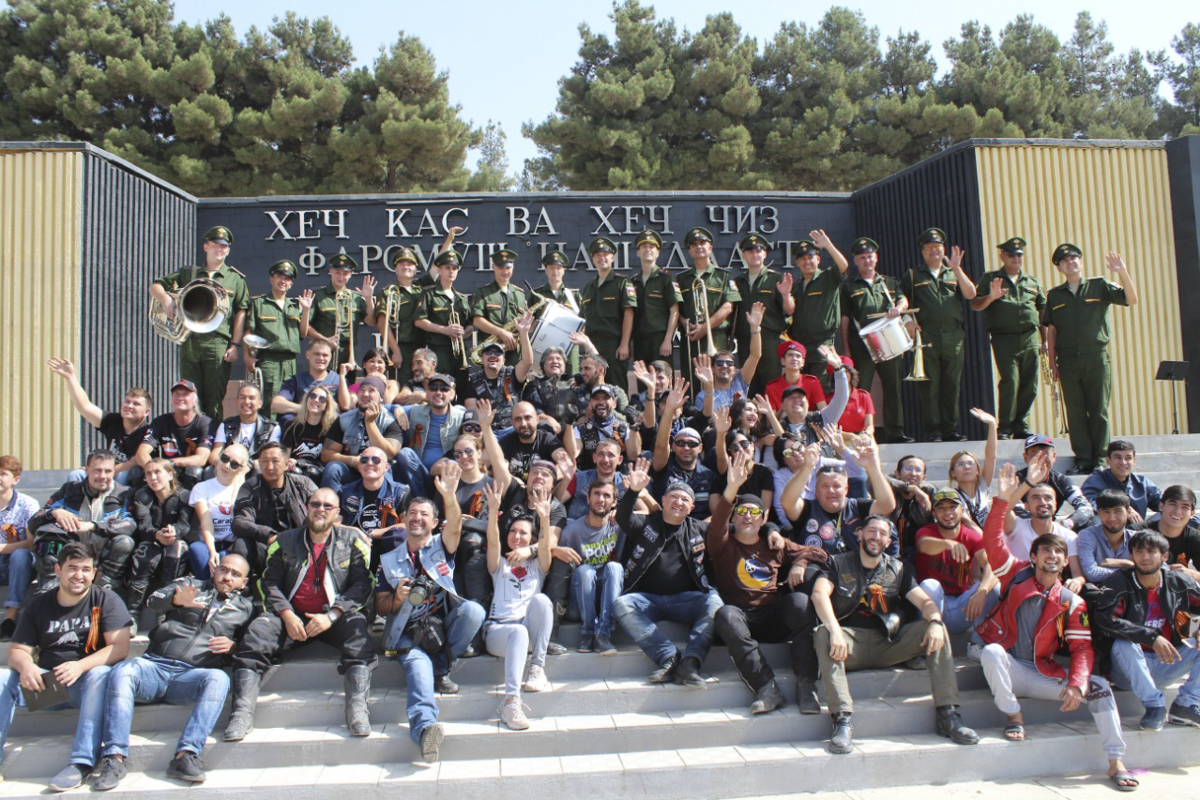
The military band of the base at Victory Park.

On 13 August 2003 the 201st Motor Rifle Division participated in a joint exercise with the Tajik military 10 km southwest of Dushanbe at the Lyaur testing ground.

At one point during the civil war in Tajikistan, soldiers of the 201st Motor Rifle Division safely escorted staff of the US Embassy in Dushanbe to the airport for evacuation. This marks the only time in history that Americans have officially asked for and been given protection by the Russian military.

In October 2004, it was renamed the 201st Military Base. In October 2012, it was signed an agreement extending the term of deployment of the Russian military base in Tajikistan until 2042. Within the planned rearmament, about 100 units of new equipment, mostly the BTR-82A armored personnel carriers, as well as more than 10 T-72B1 tanks, have been delivered to the 201st Military Base in 2016, as well as a Borisoglebsk-2 EW system and a Garmony air defence radar plus Silok anti-drone EW complexes delivered in 2018. A battalion of unmanned aviation armed with Orlan-10 drones was formed in 2019. A first-ever divisional set of the air defense system S-300PS has entered combat duty at the Russian 201st military base in Tajikistan, the Central Military District’s press-service told TASS on Saturday, 26 October 2019. 14 vehicles, including 8 modernized BMP-2Ms IFVs, were delivered in March 2020 and two Mi-8MTV5-1 combat transport helicopters in September 2020. 20 Verba MANPADS were delivered in June 2021 and 17 BMP-2Ms in the next August. The base furthermore received the Kalashnikov AK-12 assault rifles and Yarygin handguns to replace Makarov pistols, ASVK-M large-caliber army sniper rifles, long-range flamethrowers and a batch of Kornet anti-tank missiles as of August 2021. NSV Utes heavy machine guns entered service with the base in September 2021 and Aistenok reconnaissance and fire control systems in November. 30 modernized T-72B3M tanks entered service in December 2021 and 12 communications vehicles in early 2022.

On September 14, 2022, Radio Free Europe/Radio Liberty reported amidst heavy fighting and Russian casualties during the invasion of Ukraine, that 1,500 troops from the unit were deployed to Ukraine as well as up to 600 more would be deployed from there and other Russian units in Bokhtar. The base's chief media officer, Vasily Makhovoy, would neither confirm, nor deny the claim. Reportedly, soldiers on base and local civilians noticed the drop in presence from the unit's personnel, further indicating this claim.

On October 7, 2024, the unit received a commendation from Russian Minister of Defence Andrey Belousov for the capture of Hrodivka.

On December 15, 2025, the unit was awarded the Guards status.

== Subordinated units and fighting strength ==
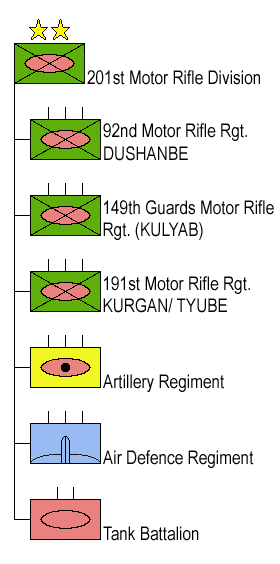
201st Motor Rifle Division in 2004

201st Motor Rifle Division (base)

- 92nd Motor Rifle Regiment – Giprozemgorodok Garrison, Dushanbe
- 149th Guards Motor Rifle Regiment – Kulyab Garrison
- 191st Motor Rifle Regiment – Kurgan-Tyube Garrison
- 998th Artillery Regiment (withdrawn from Tajikistan 2006)
- 1098th Air Defence Regiment (withdrawn from Tajikistan 2006)
- Separate Tank Battalion (withdrawn from Tajikistan 2006)
- 783rd Separate Reconnaissance Battalion
- 340th Separate Repair and Restoration Battalion
- 636th Separate Service Support Battalion
- 252nd Separate Communications Battalion
- 212th Separate Communications Battalion (territorial)
- 303rd Separate Helicopter Squadron using four Mi-24 and four Mi-8 helicopters
- 670th Air Group (squadron) equipped with five SU-25 aircraft, subordinated to the 201st Military Base Command to which also belongs the 201st Division.

=== Total strength ===
- 6,000–7,000 men
- 96 tanks (T-72B3)
- 300 armoured personnel carriers (BTR-82A)
- 54 artillery pieces
- 1,100 other vehicles
- Orlan-10 UAV
- 8 helicopters
- 5 ground attack aircraft
