= Vilis Janums =

Latvian officer

- Janums in 1943
- Born: 7 January 1894; Code parish, Russian Empire (Now Bauska Municipality, Latvia)
- Died: 6 August 1981 (aged 87); Münster, West Germany
- Military career
- Allegiance: (Russia) Russian Empire; Latvia; Nazi Germany
- Branch: Russian Imperial Army; Latvian Army; Waffen SS
- Service years: 1914–1918; 1919-1940; 1943-1945
- Rank: Waffen-Standartenfuhrer
- Units: Latvian riflemen reserve regiment 4. Vidzeme Latvian riflemen regiment 2nd. Ventspils infantry regiment 1st. Kurzeme infantry division 15th Waffen Grenadier Division of the SS (1st Latvian)
- Conflicts: World War I Latvian War of Independence; World War II
- Awards: Iron Cross I Class; Iron Cross II Class; German Cross (in Gold); Order of Three Stars; Order of Viesturs; Order of St. Stanislaus (III class); Cross of St. George (IV class)

Vilis Janums (7 January 1894 – 6 August 1981) was a Latvian officer in the First World War and later also in the Second World War. He was awarded with the Order of Three Stars (IV class), Order of Viesturs and German Cross (in gold).

== Early life ==
Vilis Janums was born on 7 January 1894 in Code parish, Courland Governorate. His father was a mason. He studied in a Bauska city school and graduated shortly before the First World War.

== First World War ==
In October 1914 Janums was mobilized in the Russian imperial army. He served in artillery units. In 1916 he graduated from the school of the praporshchiks in Orianenbaum and was transferred to the 198th reserve infantry regiment. In April 1916 he was transferred to Latvian riflemen reserve regiment where he was a junior officer. Since February 1917 he served in the 4th Vidzeme Latvian riflemen regiment where he was a junior officer in a machine-gun unit. Together with his unit he participated in the Battle of Jugla. In February 1918, when riflemen units went to inner Russia, he was demobilized from military service and stayed in German-occupied Vidzeme. Later he traveled to his native Code parish. In January 1919 in Riga he was drafted into the Soviet Red Army and served in the 4th Soviet riflemen regiment. In June he deserted from the Red Army and joined the Latvian army.

== Latvian War of Independence ==
In June 1919 he started his service in the Latvian army as a lieutenant. He was a communication officer in the Cēsis regiment. He took part in Battle of Cēsis. In August he was transferred to the 2nd Ventspils infantry regiment where he was a junior officer in a machine-gun company. In January 1920 he participated in liberation of Latgale (Most notably: Battle of Rēzekne). After the battle he became commander of a machine-gun company and was promoted to First lieutenant.

== Republic of Latvia ==
After the War of Independence Janums stayed in the military. In 1921 he was promoted to captain and in 1924 graduated officer courses. He studied in the Czechoslovak military academy which he graduated in 1930. In August he was transferred to the general staff of the Latvian army and promoted to lieutenant-colonel in November. In 1937 he briefly became a battalion commander in the 6th Riga infantry regiment. In 1938 he became a lecturer in the Latvian military academy. In November 1939 he became chief of staff for the 1st Kurzeme infantry division. In this post he witnessed the Occupation of Latvia by the Soviet Union on 17 June 1940. In the autumn of the same year he was demobilized shortly before being promoted to colonel. In the spring of 1941 he managed to travel to Germany.

== Second World War ==
Janums returned to Latvia soon after Operation Barbarossa was launched. Until 1943 he was a clerk in the Latvian self-government. In June he was appointed a regiment commander in the 15th Waffen Grenadier division of the SS with the rank of Waffen-Standartenfuhrer. In February 1944 he was awarded the Iron Cross (2nd class) and in August with the 1st class. For successful defensive battles in Pomerania he was awarded the German Cross (in gold) on 1 March 1945. In April Janums receives an order to form a battle group from units of his regiment and send it to Berlin. Battle group (Kampfgruppe Janums) was formed but instead of sending it to Berlin where it most likely would perish in the senseless battles, Janums disobeyed orders and led his group (more than 700 men) to the west. They bypassed Berlin from the south and safely reached the allied lines on 26 April near Lindau. After communication with Americans Janums and his whole battle group on the next day crossed the front line near Gutergluck village and surrendered to the American army.

== Post war ==
From May 1945 Janums was in allied captivity. He was released in 1946. Janums actively participated in the exile Latvian community. In 1946 he was one of the founders of the Daugavas Vanagi (Hawks of Daugava) Latvian military veteran organization and its first president. The rest of his life was spent in West Germany. He died in Munster 6 August 1981. In 2007 his remains were reburied in Brothers Cemetery, Riga.

== See also ==
- CIA's File on Vilis Janums
