= 43rd Guards Rifle Division =

- Active: 1942–1947
- Country: Soviet Union
- Branch: Red Army
- Type: Division
- Role: Infantry
- Engagements: Battle of Demyansk; Leningrad-Novgorod Offensive; Rezhitsa–Dvinsk Offensive; Baltic Offensive; Riga Offensive; Courland Pocket
- Battle honours: Riga

Commanders
- Notable commanders: Jānis Veikins (Yan Yanovich Veikin); Detlavs Brantkalns (Detlav Karlovich Brantkaln); Alfrēds Kalniņš (Alfred Yurevich Kalnin)

The 43rd Guards 'Latvian' Rifle Division (Russian: 43-я гвардейская Латышская стрелковая дивизия, Latvian: 43. gvardes latviešu strēlnieku divīzija) was an elite Latvian-based infantry division of the Red Army during World War II.

The division was formed as an elite infantry division of the Red Army in October 1942, based on the 1st formation of the 201st Rifle Division. The 201st was the only division made up of Latvian nationals in the Red Army until 1944, and the 43rd was immediately nicknamed the "Latvian Guards" division, which remained throughout its existence.

Formed in the Northwestern Front, its initial service was in the prolonged fighting around the Demyansk salient until that was evacuated by German Army Group North in February 1943. Through the rest of the year, it fought in that Front, mostly facing the several German strongpoints in the area of Velikiye Luki.

Beginning in January 1944, the division took part in the offensive that finally drove the German forces away from Leningrad. Before the summer offensive, while in the 22nd Army of the 2nd Baltic Front, it provided a cadre to form the 130th Latvian Rifle Corps, serving in that Corps for the duration of the war. Through 1943 and into 1944, the division was able to remain closer to full strength than many other Soviet units because it drew on a relatively large pool of Latvian refugee Communist Party members and Komsomol, who had escaped ahead of the Germans in 1941. It crossed the border back into Latvia in July and entered Riga on October 16, winning a battle honor in the process. For the duration of the war, the 43rd Guards served mostly on the Leningrad Front, containing and reducing the German forces trapped in the Courland Pocket, and also engaging in restoration work in its war-battered homeland. It continued to serve in this manner until it was converted to a rifle brigade in April 1947.

== Formation ==
The 43rd Guards received its Guards banner and title in a ceremony on October 19. At this time, it was serving in the 11th Army of the Northwestern Front, north of the "Ramushevo corridor" that connected the German 16th Army with its II Army Corps within the Demyansk salient. After the subunits received their designations, the division's order of battle was as follows:

- 121st Guards Rifle Regiment (from 92nd Rifle Regiment)
- 123rd Guards Rifle Regiment (from 122nd Rifle Regiment)
- 125th Guards Rifle Regiment (from 191st Rifle Regiment)
- 94th Guards Artillery Regiment (from 220th Light Artillery Regiment)
- 48th Guards Antitank Battalion
- 44th Guards Antiaircraft Battery (from 100th Antiaircraft Battery)
- 55th Guards Machine Gun Battalion (from 270th Machine Gun Battalion, until February 28, 1943)
- 45th Guards Reconnaissance Company (from 112th Reconnaissance Company)
- 47th Guards Sapper Battalion (from 53rd Sapper Battalion)
- 65th Guards Signal Battalion (later, 47th Guards Signal Company)
- 50th Guards Medical/Sanitation Battalion (from 49th Medical/Sanitation Battalion)
- 46th Guards Chemical Defense (Anti-gas) Company
- 49th Guards Motor Transport Company
- 51st Guards Field Bakery
- 41st Guards Divisional Veterinary Hospital
- 1476th Field Postal Station
- 911th Field Office of the State Bank

Maj. Gen. Jānis Veikins (Yan Yanovich Veikin) remained in command of the division after redesignation. As was the case with most newly designated Guards divisions, the 201st had been somewhat reduced in strength in the assaults that earned it its new status. It was noted as having 9,453 personnel, close to establishment for that period of the war, but had only 5,713 rifles and carbines, 65 heavy machine guns, 197 light machine guns, 1,202 submachine guns, 18 120 mm and 85 82 mm mortars, 212 antitank rifles, 8 122 mm howitzers, 29 45 mm antitank guns, 135 trucks, and, most unusually, no 76 mm guns at all. The 44th Guards Antiaircraft Battery was also without weapons until March 1943.

== Battle of Demyansk ==
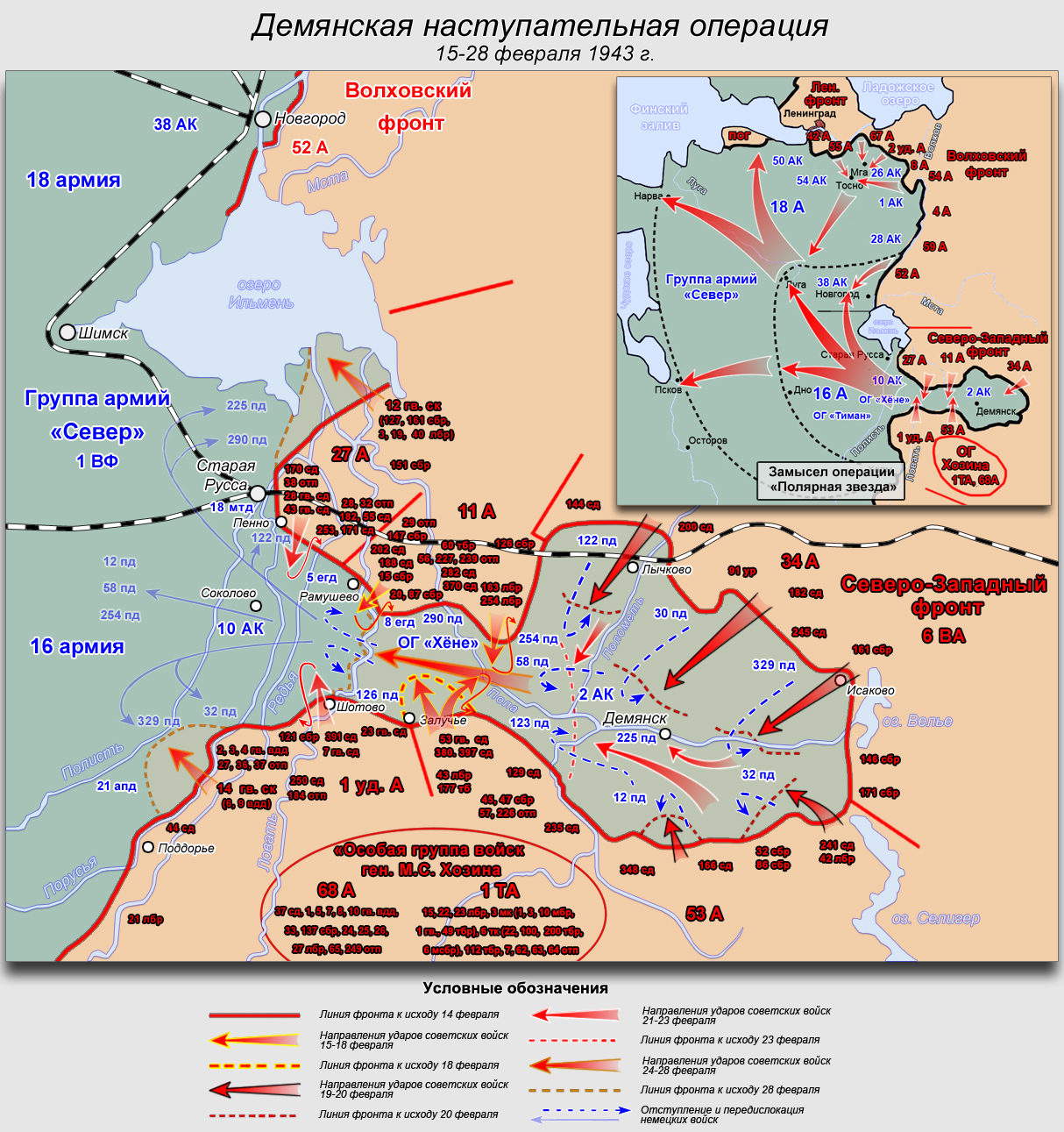
Soviet positions at Demyansk, spring 1943. The 43rd Guards was near Penno in the 27th Army, north of the entrance to the Ramushevo corridor.

In mid-October, Marshal S. K. Timoshenko, the STAVKA coordinator for the Northwestern Front's operations, began planning another offensive to cut the German corridor; in part, this was intended as a diversion from the upcoming Operation Mars. The attack was to involve the 11th Army from the north and the 1st Shock Army from the south, to commence on October 22. However, as with Mars, this operation was postponed several times, mainly due to adverse weather. When the operation finally began on the night of November 23/24, the 11th Army consisted of ten rifle divisions, including the 43rd Guards, plus five rifle brigades, one tank brigade, three battalions, and 26 artillery regiments. It faced elements of the 8th Jäger, 290th and 81st Infantry Divisions, giving it an advantage of about 3:1 in infantry and 5:1 in armor, although the rough and roadless terrain and miserable weather hampered supplies and negated much of the numerical advantage.

On November 27, after probing attacks by the 202nd Rifle Division in the direction of Pustynia, which gained little ground over several days, Timoshenko ordered the two armies to commit their main forces in an attempt to break the stalemate. While the 202nd was finally able to gain its objective, overall, the attackers seized only small footholds in the German defenses at the cost of heavy losses. Although the STAVKA soon recognized the offensive had failed, it insisted on December 8 that it continue, and several equally fruitless efforts were made into mid-January 1943. Meanwhile, on December 30, General Veikin was effectively demoted to command of the 14th Guards Rifle Regiment of the 7th Guards Rifle Division. The next day, he was succeeded in command of the division by Col. Detlavs Brantkalns (Detlav Karlovich Brantkaln), who would be promoted to the rank of major general on January 29. Early in February, it was transferred to the 27th Army of the same Front, which was located closer to the mouth of the Ramushevo corridor.

In the wake of Operation Iskra, which broke the German land blockade of Leningrad in January, Marshal Georgy Zhukov conceived a plan to encircle and destroy Army Group North: Operation Polar Star. The first phase of the overall operation would be yet another attempt to cut off and eliminate the Demyansk salient. Zhukov finalized his plan during the week preceding the planned attack date of February 15, and the 11th and 27th Armies together had nine rifle divisions, including the 43rd Guards, plus 150 tanks, massed between Penno and Ramushevo against the 5th Jäger Division. However, in light of the encirclement and impending surrender of the 6th Army at Stalingrad, on January 31, Hitler had authorized the evacuation of II Corps. Operation Ziethen began on February 17 before the delayed Soviet attack could get fully underway, and effectively short-circuited Zhukov's entire plan; the 27th Army would still be redeploying as late as the 21st. Demyansk was abandoned on February 21, and by February 26, most of the corridor was evacuated as well.

=== Into western Russia ===
Ziethen freed up sufficient German forces to reinforce their positions at Staraya Russa and along the Lovat River. The town of Kholm had held out under siege until May, and while Velikiye Luki had been liberated by the 3rd Shock Army in January, there were several German strongpoints, most notably Novosokolniki, that continued to block further Soviet advances to the west. During the remainder of the year, the 43rd Guards was one of the units of the Northwestern Front responsible for guarding these garrisons and engaging in local battles to improve positions and gain intelligence. During this time, the division came under several commands. In April, it left the 27th Army and joined the 68th Army. During May, it was moved to the Front reserves, where it remained into June. In July, it was assigned as a separate division in the 34th Army. In August, it came under the command of the 12th Guards Rifle Corps with the 7th Guards and 26th Rifle Divisions, back in the Front reserves, and remained there into October. During that month, it was reassigned as a separate division to the 22nd Army in the new 2nd Baltic Front, and remained under those commands for most of the rest of the war.

At the beginning of January 1944, the 43rd Guards had 8,127 personnel on strength, which was considerably more than most rifle divisions at this period of the war. Given the large percentage of Communist Party members, the unit gained the unofficial status of an assault division. It was armed with 3,489 rifles and carbines, 2,709 submachine guns, 308 light machine guns, 142 heavy machine guns, 105 (82 mm) and 24 (120 mm) mortars, 169 (antitank) rifles, 12 (122 mm) howitzers, 36 (76 mm) cannons, 29 (45 mm anti-tank) guns, 12 light anti-aircraft guns, and 165 trucks.

=== Leningrad–Novgorod Offensive ===
When the Leningrad–Novgorod Offensive began on January 14, the 2nd Baltic Front was assigned a mostly diversionary role in tying down German reserves. At this time, Lt. Col. Jānis Rainbergs (also known as Yan Ludvigovich Rainberg) was the deputy commander of the 125th Guards Rifle Regiment, who had earlier distinguished himself in the fighting near Ramushevo. Overnight, he led an assault force consisting of two ski battalions, one from his own division and another from the 33rd Rifle Division, into action north of Novosokolniki. The ski troops broke through the German defenses at the village of Fedoruhnovo and raided into the rear, cutting the Novosokolniki - Dno railway and seizing the village of Monakovo, where they captured the headquarters of an engineer battalion with 25 soldiers and one officer. The raid provoked a strong response, and over the next 12 hours, Rainbergs' detachment was forced to fight off 11 counterattacks by infantry and tanks, gradually running short of antitank ammunition and grenades. German armor eventually advanced to within 30–40 m of the Soviet positions, and Colonel Rainbergs was killed in action. Despite this, his men were able to hold out until relieved by the division's main forces and officially accounted for up to nine tanks and three battalions of infantry. On June 4, Rainbergs was posthumously awarded the title of Hero of the Soviet Union.

As part of the same fighting, on January 16, Cpt. Mihails Orlovs (Mikhail Ivanovich Orlov, born 1918 in Krāslava Parish), commander of the 4th Company of the 125th Guards Regiment, was forced to take command of the 2nd Battalion from Major Gubanov and lead it into an attack on German positions near the village of Borsuchka. The battalion succeeded in occupying several trenches and bunkers and killed or captured 60 officers and men. For his actions, Orlovs was awarded the Order of the Red Banner.

== Baltic offensives ==
On June 5, the division provided a cadre to form the headquarters of the 130th Rifle Corps, including General Brantkalns, who became its commander. He was replaced in divisional command by Col. Alfrēds Kalniņš (Alfred Yurevich Kalnin); Kalniņš, in turn, would be promoted to the rank of major general on September 13 and remained in this post for the duration of the war. The Corps included the 43rd Guards and the 3rd formation of the 308th Rifle Division, which was also made up of Latvian nationals, plus the 2nd formation of the 208th Rifle Division, which was not.

On July 10, the 2nd Baltic Front launched the Rezhitsa–Dvinsk Offensive, and over the next seven days, it broke through three heavily fortified German defensive lines and advanced up to 110 km westward. At 0430 hours on July 18, lead elements of the 43rd Guards crossed back into Latvia. On August 3, Captain Orlovs, who was now the acting commander of a reconnaissance company, led his troops to the vicinity of the Mežāre Station on the Krustpils – Rēzekne II Railway, well into the German rear. This incursion provoked a series of counterattacks by infantry and at least one assault gun, and the company became surrounded. Orlovs received several wounds and many of his men were also killed or wounded while inflicting heavy casualties on the German forces. Eventually, he led a breakout which recrossed the railway, and the remainder of his company dug in and repelled additional attacks until relieved by their battalion. Captain Orlovs soon succumbed to his injuries, was buried near Mežāre Station, and on March 24, 1945, was posthumously made a Hero of the Soviet Union, becoming one of the three recipients of the title among the servicemen of the "Latvian" Soviet Army Units. However, Latvian contemporary historian Uldis Neiburgs writes that despite Orlovs' bravery, some Soviet postwar works tended to embellish his feats, such as repeatedly attempting to cross the Ataša River on boats under heavy enemy fire, despite the river being only a few meters wide and easy to cross for infantry due to the low depth.

By the second week of September, the division had continued its advance as far as Viesīte, having crossed the Daugava River in the vicinity of Krustpils. In the first days of October, its advance elements reached Baldone, moving towards Riga from the southeast. It was one of many Red Army units granted the name of that city as an honorific:

"RIGA"... 43rd Guards Rifle Division (Major General Kalnin, Alfred Yurevich)... The troops who participated in the liberation of Riga, by the order of the Supreme High Command of October 13, 1944, and a commendation in Moscow, are given a salute of 24 artillery salvoes from 324 guns.

Shortly after this, the 130th Corps, now consisting of just the two Latvian national divisions, was transferred to the 67th Army in the Leningrad Front, but in November, it returned to the 22nd Army in the 2nd Baltic Front. The division remained under these commands into March 1945, when the 2nd Baltic was disbanded and the Corps was reassigned to the 42nd Army in the Leningrad Front's Kurland Group of Forces, where it remained until the fighting stopped. During the entire period following the battle for Riga, the division took part in the containment and reduction of the German forces (former Army Group North) trapped in the Courland peninsula of Latvia (the Army Group Courland).

== Postwar ==
In July 1946, General Kalniņš handed his command over to Maj. Gen. Voldemārs Dambergs (Voldemar Damberg), who had previously been the deputy commander of the 130th Rifle Corps. In April 1947, the division was converted to the 29th Separate Guards Rifle Brigade, with Dambergs remaining in command.
