= Gorokhovets =

Gorokhovets (Russian: Гороховец) is the name of several inhabited localities in Russia.

Urban localities

- Gorokhovets, Vladimir Oblast, a town in Gorokhovetsky District of Vladimir Oblast

Rural localities

- Gorokhovets, Leningrad Oblast, a village in Glazhevskoye Settlement Municipal Formation of Kirishsky District of Leningrad Oblast
