= Zhestianaya Gorka massacre =

Nazi war crimes in the Soviet Union

- Part of Eastern Front (World War II)
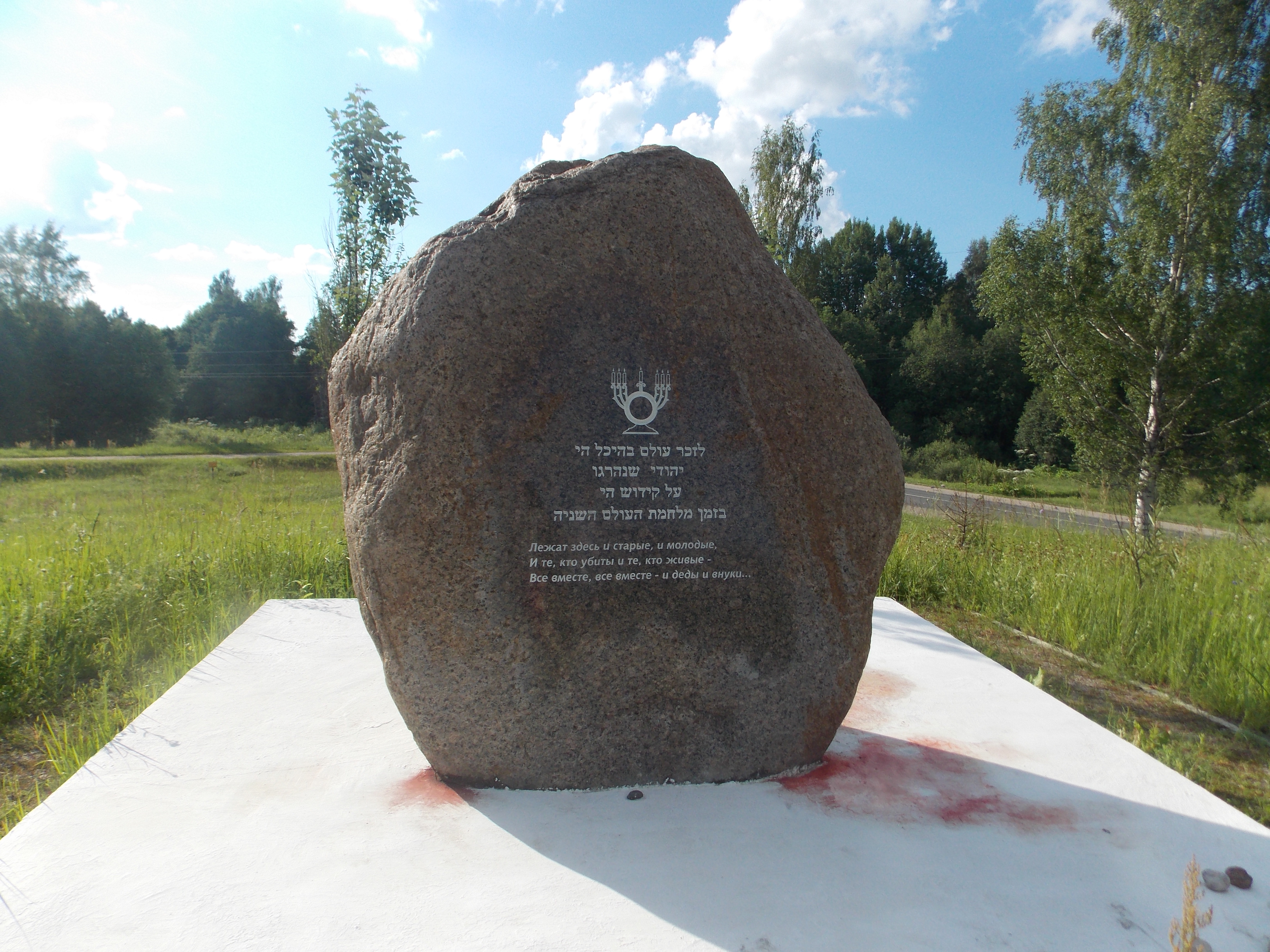
- Mass grave of victims near Zhestianaya Gorka
- Location: Zhestianaya Gorka, Novgorod Oblast, Soviet Union
- Date: 1941–1943
- Target: Soviet civilians and partisans
- Attack type: Mass Murder
- Deaths: 2600
- Perpetrators: Latvian Auxiliary Police, Einsatzgruppen
- Motive: Genocide

The Zhestianaya Gorka massacre was a World War II massacre of partisans and civilians, mostly women and children, carried out in the village of Zhestianaya Gorka (now Novgorod oblast, Russia) by Schutzmannschaft and Nazi collaborators.

== Massacre ==
The massacre was not an unusual incident in the Soviet Union during World War II. In 1942—1944 German occupiers and their Russian and Latvian collaborators killed at least 2600 people in Zhestianaya Gorka. Russian historian Boris Kovalyov proved that a concentration camp was built near Zhestianaya Gorka.

== Post-war trials ==
German general Kurt Herzog and 18 his troops were tried in Novgorod in 1947. They were received prison for 25 years. Kurt Herzog died in 1948 at a prison, another inmates were released in 1954.

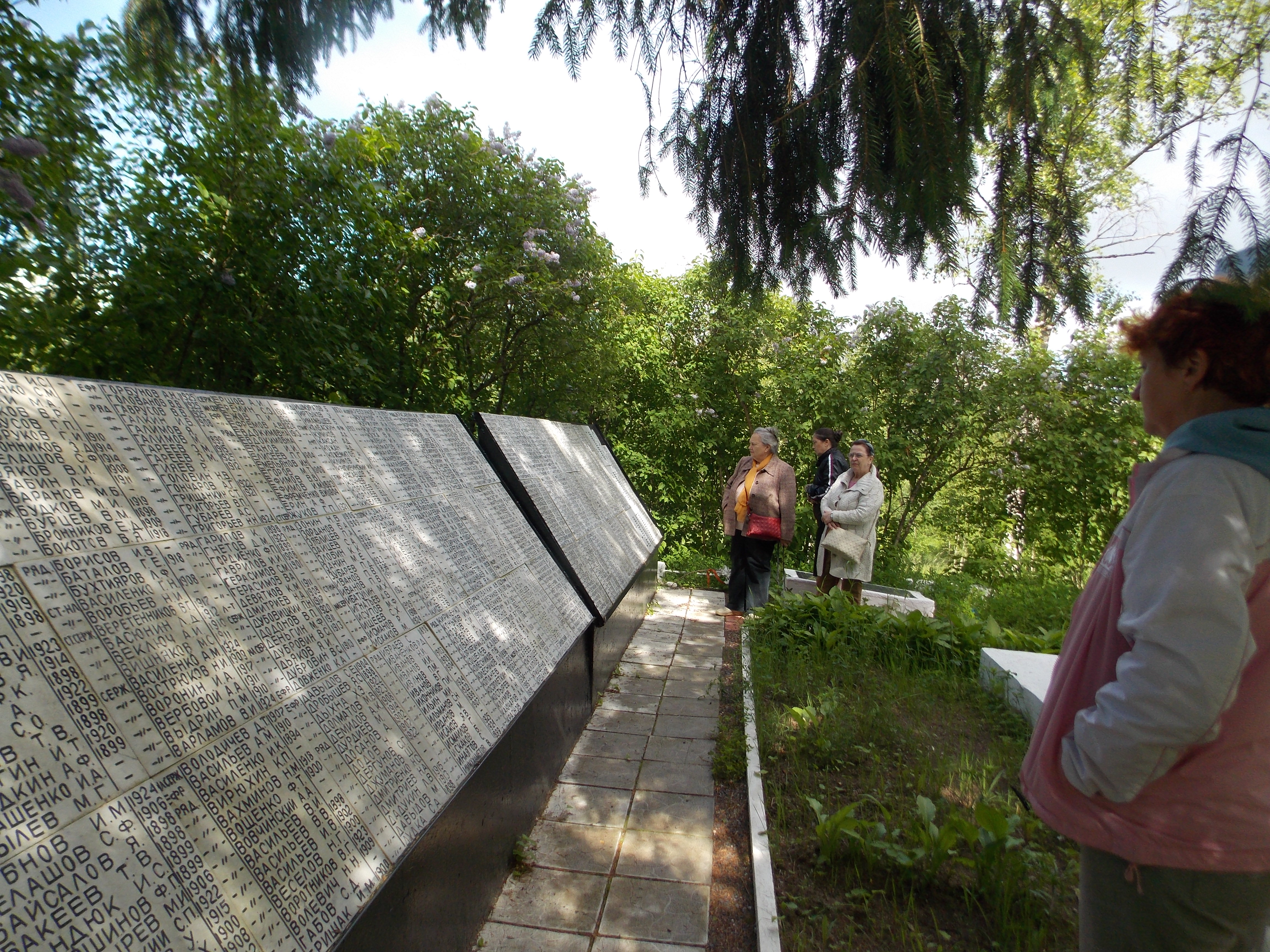
Mass grave of victims in Zhestianaya Gorka
