= Order of Viesturs =

Order of Viesturs Viestura ordenis
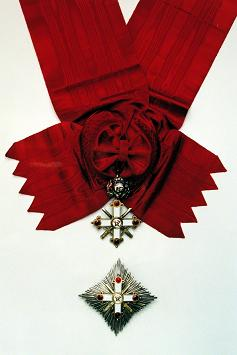
- Grand Cross of the order with swords
- Type: 5 class Order, with three honor medals. Awarded with swords (military) and without (civil).
- Awarded for: merit in service to the armed forces; safeguarding and strengthening national security and social order; defense of the country's borders.
- Presented by: Latvia
- Motto: Confortamini et pugnate (Be strong and fight)
- Established: 11 August 1938
- Ribbon for civil awards Ribbon for military awards

Precedence
- Next (higher): Order of the Three Stars
- Next (lower): Cross of Recognition

The Order of Viesturs (Latvian: Viestura ordenis) is a Latvian state order founded in 1938, which was temporarily discontinued in 1940 by the Soviet occupation of Latvia, but was re-established in 2004. The order is named after the medieval historical figure King Viesturs of ancient Semigallia. Currently it is the highest military-related award still awarded by Latvia.

== Classes of the Order ==
The order is awarded in the following classes:

- Grand Cross: Cross is worn suspended from a sash worn over the shoulder with a breast star.
- Grand Officer: Cross is worn suspended from the neck with a breast star
- Commander: Cross is worn suspended from the neck
- Officer: Cross is worn suspended from a ribbon with rosette worn on the chest
- Knight: Cross is worn suspended from a ribbon worn on the chest.

The order also has three medals that may be awarded in the civil or military divisions:

- Gold Medal
- Silver Medal
- Bronze Medal

| 1st class with swords | 1st class | 1st class with swords, dames | 1st class, dames |
| 2nd class with swords | 2nd class | 2nd class with swords, dames | 2nd class, dames |
| 3rd class with swords | 3rd class | 3rd class with swords, dames | 3rd class, dames |
| 4th class | 5th class | | |
