= 308th Rifle Division =

308th Infantry Division
- Emblem of the Soviet Army
- Active: 25 December 1941 - May 1946
- Allegiance: Soviet Union
- Branch: Red Army; Soviet Army
- Type: Infantry
- Size: Rifle Division: 12,133 personnel in 1942
- Part of: 62nd Army
- Garrison/HQ: Ivanovo

The 308th Rifle Division was a rifle division of the Soviet Red Army during World War II. The division was formed three separate times during the course of the war.

== First Formation ==
The 308th Rifle Division first started forming on 25 December 1941 at Ivanovo in the Moscow Military District. On 7 January 1942, while still forming the division was redesignated the 117th Rifle Division. See the 117th Rifle Division's entry for more information.

== Second Formation ==
The 308th Rifle Division (2nd formation) was formed in accordance with Order Number 0044 of the Siberian Military District dated 21 March 1942. It was formed at Omsk in the Siberian Military District, using 20% Red Army men (active duty), 25% returning wounded veterans, 25% reservists from industry, and 30% new recruits from the classes of 1922-23. Most of the recruits and reservists came from the Omsk and Krasnoyarsk oblasts. When the division left for the west it had 12,133 officers and men assigned.

The division remained in the Siberian Military District until May 1942 until it was moved to the west. In late May, the division was assigned to the 8th Reserve Army in the Reserve of the Supreme High Command. On 1 June 1942, the division, still with the 8th Reserve Army, was at Saratov. From August 29 to September 6, 1942, the division covered at least 300 kilometers on foot. On 1 August 1942 the 308th Rifle Division was part of the 24th Army in the area of Kotluban. The division joined the active army on 29 August 1942 when it was assigned to the 24th Army on the Stalingrad Front. The first fight in the division took the 24th Army on the territory of the state farm "Kotluban." The division had to seize the hamlet of Borodkin and heights of 133.4, 143.8 and 154.2. Division troops backed 217th Tank Brigade, 136 mortars, heavy artillery regiment in 1936. The enemy forces unleashed on the division powerful artillery fire, mortars, aircraft and tanks.

By the end of September 1942 the division was assigned to the 62nd Army inside Stalingrad. In the fighting at Stalingrad the division arrived came on the night of October 2, 1942, under Colonel Leontii Gurtev. As part of General V.I. Chuikov's 62nd Army, the division seized positions in the area of the "Barricades" plant. The division was finally pulled out of the city and the 62nd Army in December with only 500 men still assigned to the division. For its actions at Stalingrad September to December 1942 it was awarded the Order of the Red Banner by an order dated 19 June 1943.

Reassigned to the Volga Military District to be rebuilt, the division spent the next several months reconstituting its strength. By 1 March 1943, the division was shipped back to the front and assigned to the Kalinin Front reserves and then to the 11th Army in the STAVKA reserves.

The division returned to the front in the 3rd Army of the Bryansk Front in Operation Kutuzov. Distinguishing itself in combat, the division was awarded Guards status and redesignated the 120th Guards Rifle Division. During the remainder of 1943 the division participated in the Orel, Bryansk, and Gomel - Rechitsa operations.

As the 308th Rifle Division, the unit had two commanders. Colonel Leontii Nikolaevich Gurt'ev took over the division on 1 March 1942, was promoted to major general on 7 December 1942, and was killed in action at Pamanlovo on 3 August 1943. For his actions in taking that town, he became a Hero of the Soviet Union posthumously on 27 August 1943. His successor as division commander was Colonel Nikolai Kuz'mich Maslennikov, who took over officially on 4 August 1943 and was promoted to major general on 22 September 1943. Maslennikov was commander until the 308th became the 120th Guards Rifle Division in September 1943 in accordance with NKO Order Number 285.

== Third Formation ==
This division was organized as a Red Army national unit from 5 June to 7 July 1944 from the 1st Latvian Riflemen Reserve Regiment at Gorkiy in the Moscow Military District. The division was the last national, "ethnic" division formed during the war. The division was formed as a Latvian Division under the 130th Latvian Rifle Corps. The 130th Rifle Corps was assigned to the 2nd Baltic Front's 22nd Army from July to October 1944. They were then reassigned to the Leningrad Front's 67th Army. They fought at Aiviekste River, Jēkabpils, Olaine, Džūkste and Blīdene. By the end of the month the Corps was back with the 22nd Army and from March 1945 to the end of the war in Latvia, assigned to the Kurland Group on the Baltic Coast.

Gorokhovets district to 1st Latvian Riflemen Reserve Regiment. It contained 319th, 323rd, and 355th Riflemen and 677th Artillery Regiment, 301st Sapper Battalion, 899th Communications Battalion and Reconnaissance Company. Divisions beginning strength was about 7,300 men. The commanders were: Major General Voldemārs Dambergs and Regiment Commander M. Kalniņš. On July 12, 1944, the division headed to the front as part of the 130th Latvian Rifle Corps. First combat happened on August 5. They fought at Aiviekste River, Jēkabpils, Olaine, Džūkste and Blīdene.

The division was based in Daugavpils postwar, still with the 130th Rifle Corps. It was disbanded in May 1946 along with the corps.

=== Subordinate Units ===
- 319th Rifle Regiment
- 323rd Rifle Regiment
- 355th Rifle Regiment
- 677th Artillery Regiment
- 377th Antitank Battalion
- 309th Sapper Battalion
- 326th Medical Battalion
- 899th Signal Battalion

== See also ==
- List of infantry divisions of the Soviet Union 1917–1957
