= Dan Healey =

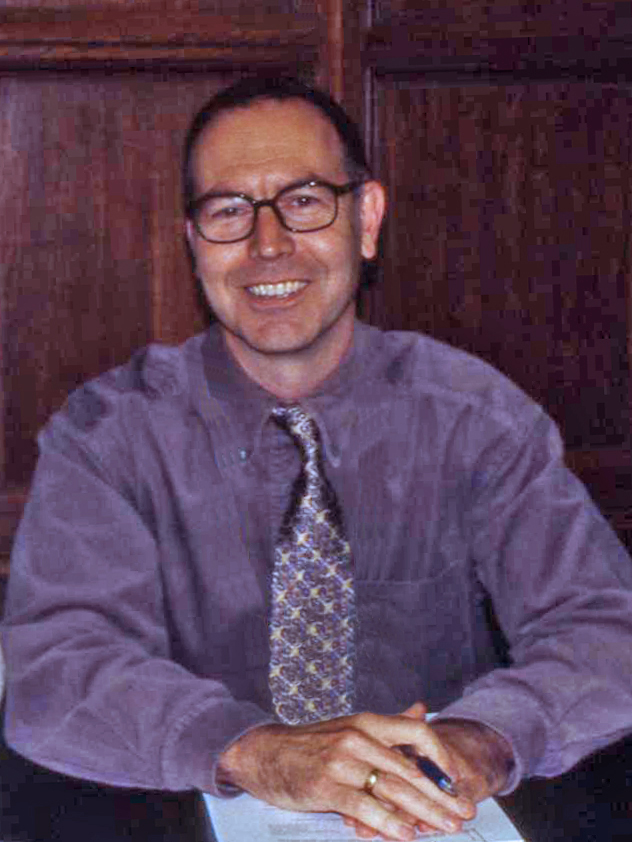
- Healey in September 2000
- Born: March 21, 1957 (age 69)
- Known for: The study of the history of homosexuality in Russia
- Awards: Second place in the Gladstone Prize of the Royal Historical Society

Academic background
- Education: University of Toronto

Academic work
- Discipline: Slavic studies

Dan Healey (born March 21, 1957) is a Canadian and English historian and Slavist. He is a pioneer of the study of the history of homosexuality in Russia.

In 1981 he graduated with a bachelor's degree in Russian Language and Literature at the University of Toronto. In the 1980s he worked in the tourism industry in Canada, Great Britain, and the USSR. In the 1990s, he returned to academia and in 1998 completed the PhD at the University of Toronto.

Healey taught at the University of Swansea (2000–2011), at the University of Reading (2011–2013), at St Antony's College of Oxford University (from 2013).

His book Homosexual Desire in Revolutionary Russia (2001) won the second place of the Gladstone Prize of the Royal Historical Society.

His scholarly interests include the history of LGBT people of Russia, Russian and Soviet medicine and psychiatry, Russian and Soviet penitentiary institutions, GULAG.

== Bibliography ==
- Homosexual Desire in Revolutionary Russia: The Regulation of Sexual and Gender Dissent. Chicago: University Of Chicago Press, 2001. — 376 p. — ISBN 0226322343, ISBN 978-0226322346
  - Гомосексуальное влечение в революционной России: регулирование сексуально-гендерного диссидентства / науч. ред. Л. В. Бессмертных, Ю. А. Михайлов, пер. с англ. Т .Ю. Логачева. В. И. Новиков. — Москва: НИЦ «Ладомир», 2008. — 624 p. — (Русская потаенная литература). — ISBN 978-5-86218-470-9.
- Bolshevik Sexual Forensics: Diagnosing Disorder in the Clinic and Courtroom, 1917–1939. DeKalb: Northern Illinois University Press, 2009. — 260 p. — ISBN 978-0875804057.
- Editor, with Frances L. Bernstein and Christopher Burton. Soviet Medicine: Culture, Practice, and Science. DeKalb: Northern Illinois University Press, 2013. — 312 p. — ISBN 978-0875804262.
- Editor, with Barbara Evans Clements and Rebecca Friedman. Russian Masculinities in History and Culture. New York: Palgrave Macmillan, 2002. — 255 p. — ISBN 978-0333945445.
- Russian Homophobia from Stalin to Sochi. London: Bloomsbury Academic, 2017. — 272 p. — ISBN 978-1350000773.
- The Gulag Doctors: Life, Death, and Medecine in Stalin's Labour Camps. New Haven: Yale University Press, 2024. — 344 p. — ISBN 978-0300187137

== Literature ==
- Алиса Кустикова (July 8, 2016). "Politicheskaya gomofobiya – eto fashizm i nenavist" Политическая гомофобия – это фашизм и ненависть [Political homophobia is fascism and hatred]. Новая газета.
- Бурлешин А. В. (2010). "Vskrytaya povsednevnost. Razmyshleniya i nablyudeniya po povodu knigi Dana Khili" Вскрытая повседневность. Размышления и наблюдения по поводу книги Дана Хили [Open daily. Reflections and observations on a book by Dan Healy]. Novoe Literaturnoe Obozrenie Naučnoe Priloženie (102). Новое литературное обозрение. ISSN 0869-6365.
- Евгений Берштейн (2002). "Drugaya istoriya" Другая история [Another story]. Новая русская книга (1). СПб.
- Марианна Муравьева (2009). "Trudnosti perevoda: ob odnopoloy lyubvi po-russki" Трудности перевода: об однополой любви по-русски [Lost in translation: on same-sex love in Russian]. Ab Imperio (1).
