= Moral explanation =

Morality

Moral explanation relates to the way of dealing with an individual towards society, cultural norms, and social behaviors. It focuses on honesty and fair dealing with everyone. Moral Explanation describes ways in which are considered correct and honest towards each member of the society.

Moral Properties tend to describe an individual in an explanatory way. The notable thinkers have carried out specific trials to form correctness and acceptability regarding Moral explanation and its properties. The first philosopher to have discussed it in detail is Gilbert Harman (Nature of Morality ch. 1; “Moral Explanations”; “Responses to Critics”).

Nicholas Sturgeon discusses it further in his article, “Moral Explanations.” See also Harman’s contribution to Moral Relativism.)

Harman discussed a group of street gangsters to elaborate immorality. The goons were pouring gasoline over the cat. Anybody who witnesses this process of setting the cat on fire may regard it as immoral or wrong. But Harman denies to accept that the actual wrong is not the action. He believes that this judgement has doubtful credibility relevant to the onlooker. He adds that it is a non‐naturalistic form of moral realism.

Harman compares it with the example of a scientist. While a scientist performs an experiment where a vapor forms at the cloud chamber and scientist declares the emulsion of a proton as something very recent- everyone will demand the proof and correctness of the statement. While no one would ask for further psychological correctness of the phenomenon occurred to the cat. This is where the difference lies.

The advocates of moral explanation declare that instances where we need to define moral property may source, or explicate non-psychological events.
