= Erpa (river) =

River in Germany

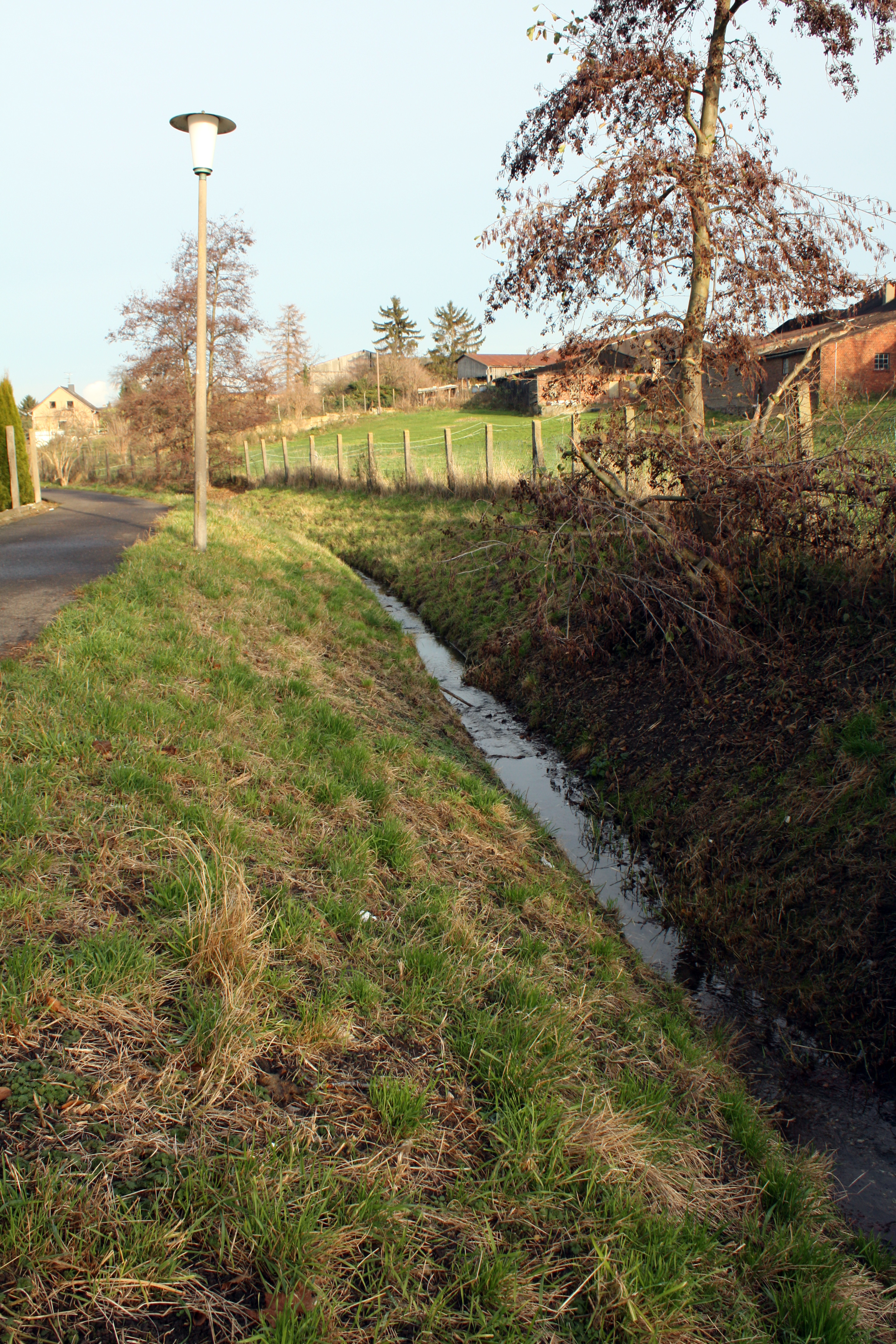
- The Erpa at Erp

Location
- Country: Germany
- State: North Rhine-Westphalia

Physical characteristics
- Source
  - location: Near Weiler in der Ebene (a district of Zülpich)
  - coordinates: 50.7892°N 6.7617°E
- Mouth
  - location: North of Ahrem into the Lechenicher Mühlengraben
  - coordinates: 50.7892°N 6.7617°E

Basin features
- Progression: Lechenicher Mühlengraben → Rotbach→ Erft→ Rhine→ North Sea

Erpa is a river of North Rhine-Westphalia, Germany.

The Erpa springs near Weiler in der Ebene, a district of Zülpich. It is a left tributary of the Lechenicher Mühlengraben North of Ahrem, a district of Erftstadt. The Lechenicher Mühlengraben is a confluence of the Rotbach.

== See also ==
- List of rivers of North Rhine-Westphalia
