= Vlattener Bach =

River in Germany

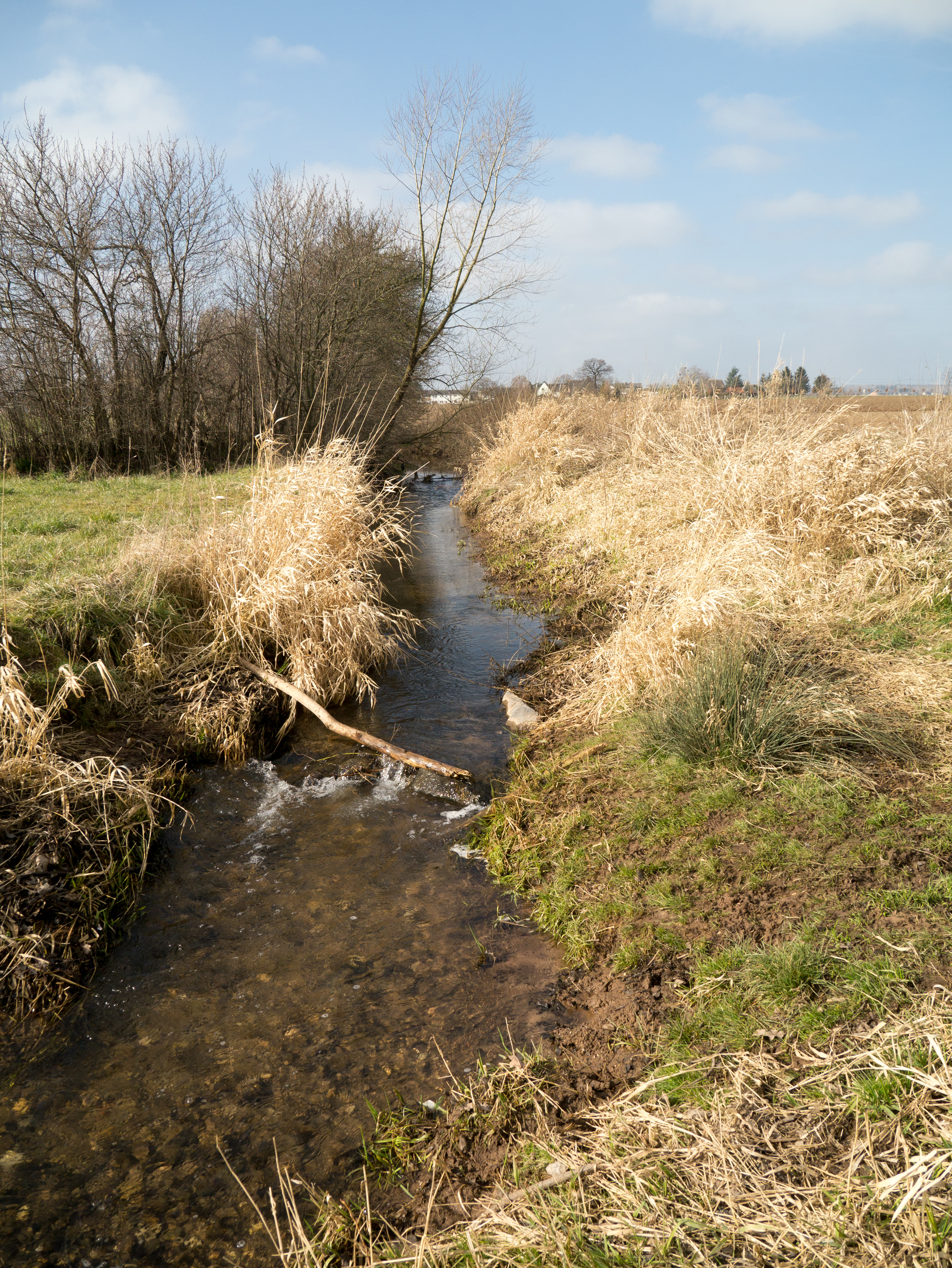

Location
- Country: Germany
- State: North Rhine-Westphalia

Physical characteristics
- Mouth
  - location: Rotbach
  - coordinates: 50.6727°N 6.6721°E

Basin features
- Progression: Rotbach→ Erft→ Rhine→ North Sea

Vlattener Bach is a river of North Rhine-Westphalia, Germany. It is 21.8 km (13.5 mi) long and a left tributary of the Rotbach on the northern edge of the Eifel, and meets Rotbach near Zülpich.

== See also ==
- List of rivers of North Rhine-Westphalia
