= Rotbach =

Rotbach may refer to:

- Rotbach (Rhine), a river of North Rhine-Westphalia, Germany, tributary of the Rhine
- Rotbach (Erft), a river of North Rhine-Westphalia, Germany, tributary of the Erft
- Rotbach (Biberach an der Riss), a river of Baden-Württemberg, Germany, tributary of the Riss
- Rotbach (Dreisam), a river of Baden-Württemberg, Germany, tributary of the Dreisam
