= Gilsbach =

River in Germany

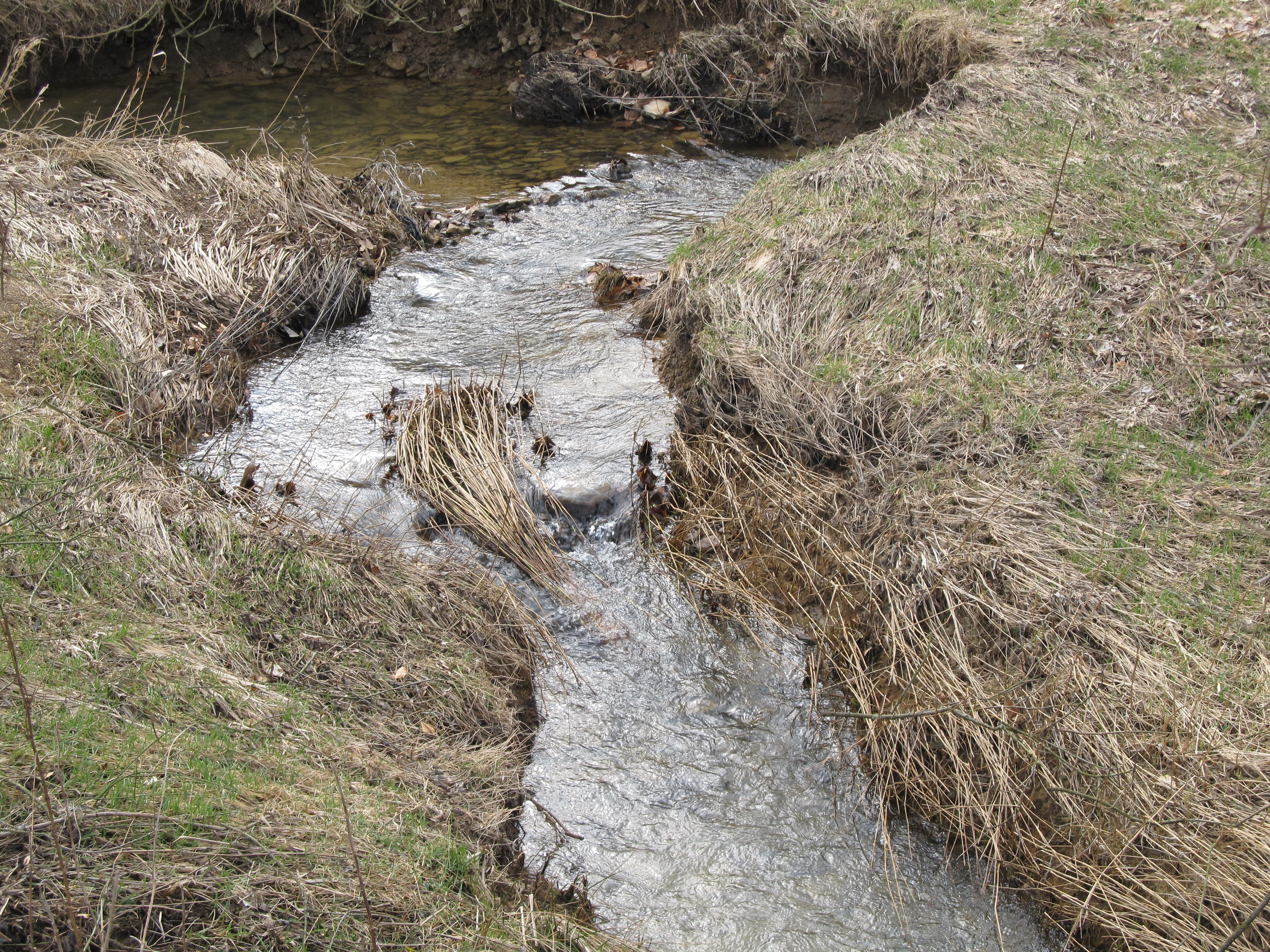

Location
- Country: Germany
- States: North Rhine-Westphalia

Physical characteristics
- Mouth
  - location: Heller
  - coordinates: 50.7643°N 8.0550°E

Basin features
- Progression: Heller→ Sieg→ Rhine→ North Sea

Gilsbach is a small river of North Rhine-Westphalia, Germany. It is 4.3 km long and flows into the Heller near Burbach.

== Similar streams by name ==
It should not be confused with other streams in North Rhine-Westphalia: another Gilsbach, a 1 km long tributary of the Asdorfer Bach; Gillbach, the tributary of the Erft; Gillesbach, the tributary of the Urft, or Gillesbach, the tributary of the Wurm.

== See also ==
- List of rivers of North Rhine-Westphalia
