= Gödersheim Castle =

Ruined Late Gothic water castle in the German state of Rhineland-Palatinate

Coordinates: 50°40′29″N 6°32′48″E

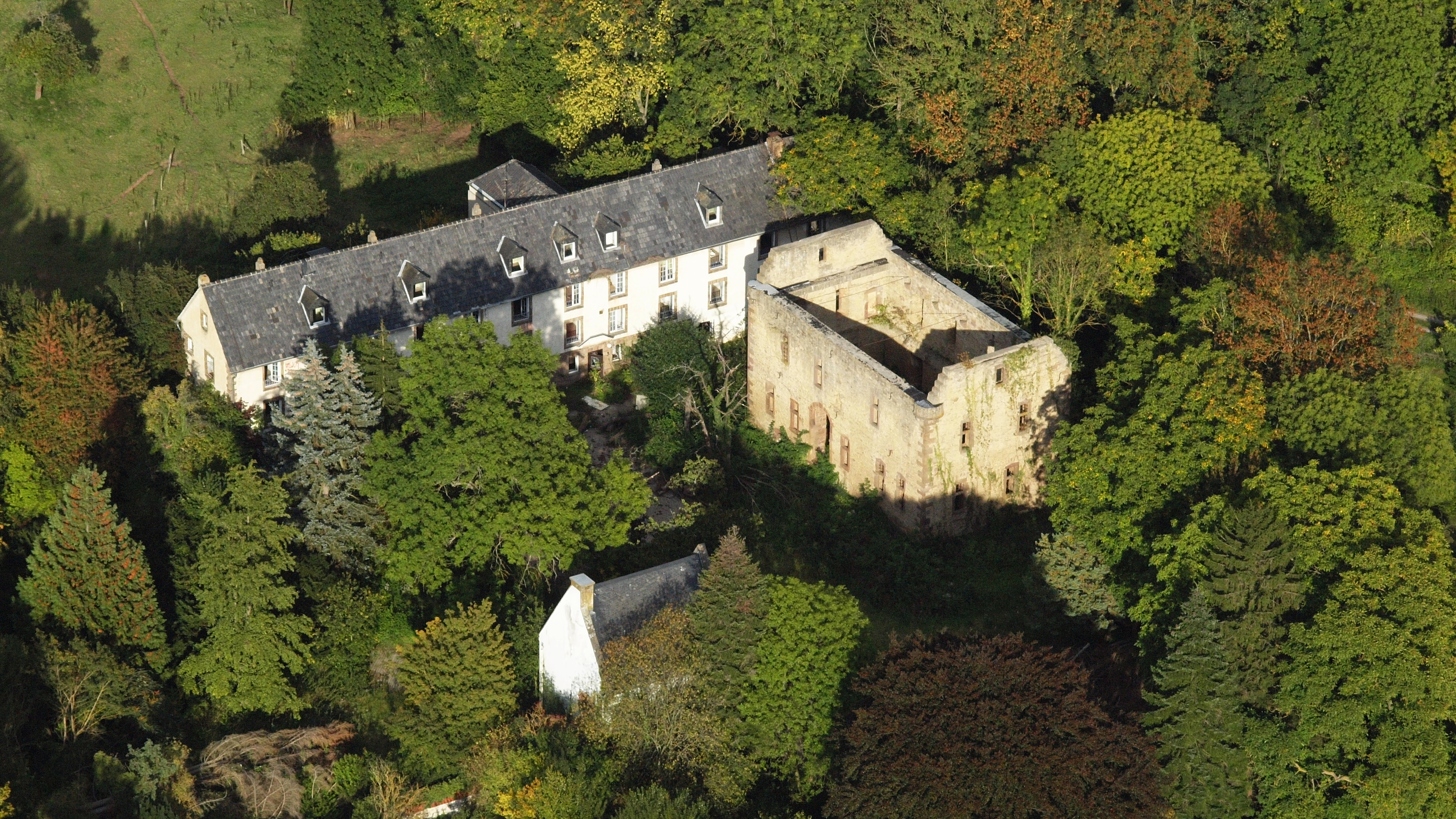
Gödersheim Castle, 2015 aerial photograph

Gödersheim Castle (German: Burg Gödersheim) is a ruined, Late Gothic, water castle a few kilometres from Wollersheim, a village in the borough of Nideggen, in the county of Düren in the German state of North Rhine-Westphalia. It is located in the valley of the Neffelbach and has been protected as an historic monument since 22 October 1993. The owners of the castle ruins and surrounding land were the Rhineland Regional Association (Landschaftsverband Rheinland) but, in 2016, an immediate neighbour, Helmut Waldmann, owner of the Gödersheim Mill, bought the ruins and adjacent buildings. He intends to demolish the buildings and build flats in the gatehouse and the ruins.

== Literature ==
- Paul Clemen (ed.): Die Kunstdenkmäler des Kreises Düren (= Die Kunstdenkmäler der Rheinprovinz. Band 9, Abt, 1). L. Schwann, Düsseldorf, 1910, pp. 355–358.
- Ulrich Coenen: Architektonische Kostbarkeiten im Kreis Düren. 2nd edn. Mainz, Aachen, 1989, ISBN 3-925714-27-8, pp. 226–227.
