= Wollersheim =

- Ortsteil of Nideggen
- Interactive map of Wollersheim
- Location within Germany Location within North Rhine-Westphalia
- Coordinates: 50°40′14″N 06°33′51″E
- Country: Germany
- State: North Rhine-Westphalia
- District: Düren
- Town: Nideggen

Area
  - Total: 10.46 km^{2} (4.04 sq mi)
- Elevation: 239 m (784 ft)

Population (2016-12-31)
  - Total: 633
  - Density: 60.5/km^{2} (157/sq mi)
- Time zone: UTC+01:00 (CET)
  - Summer (DST): UTC+02:00 (CEST)
- Postal codes: 52385
- Dialling codes: 02425

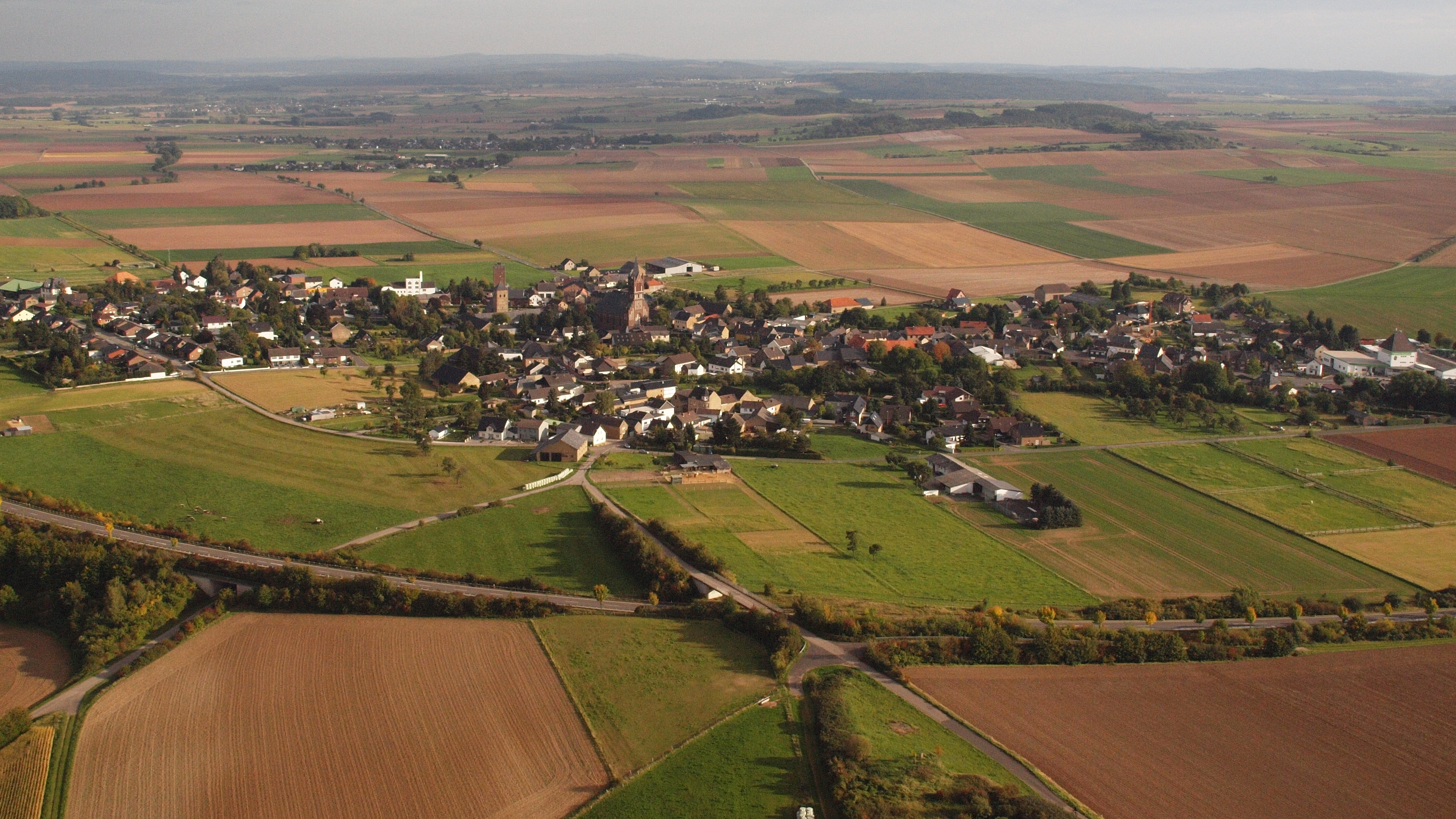
Wollersheim, 2015 aerial photograph

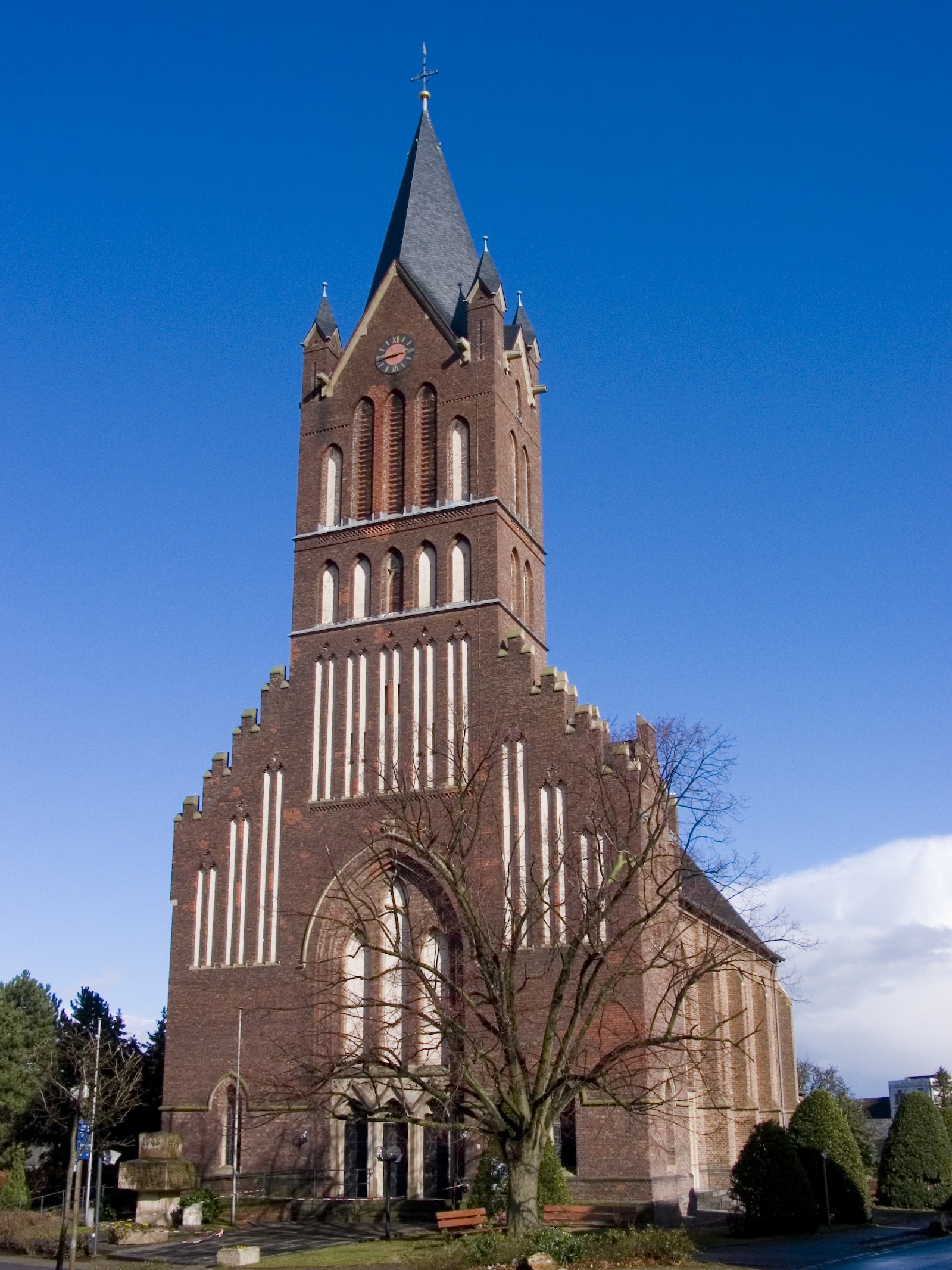
New Church

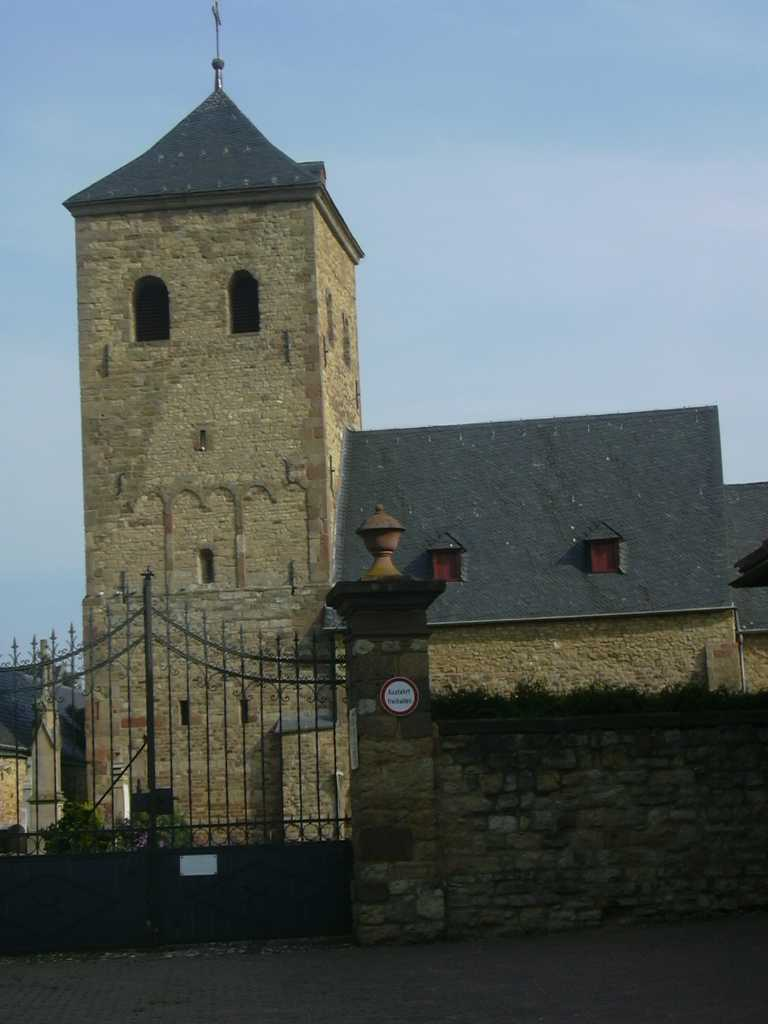
Old Church

Wollersheim is a village in the municipality of Nideggen in the district of Düren in the German state of North Rhine-Westphalia.

== Location ==
Wollersheim lies on the northern edge of the Eifel mountains. The fertile lands of the Zülpich Börde border the village. Around Wollersheim is a geological and botanical feature: the muschelkalk kuppen, which are home to numerous rare species of limestone pastures.

Southwest of the village rises the Neffelbach stream.

Wollersheim is bounded by the villages of Embken, Langendorf (municipality of Zülpich), Eppenich (municipality of Zülpich), Vlatten (municipality of Heimbach) and Berg-Thuir.

== History ==
An immense number of archaeological finds point to an early settlement of the area. In 1931/32 in the source region of the Neffelbach, six pottery kilns and several sandstone wells were excavated. Even the name of a pottery owner has survived. On one of the shards of pottery from the 2nd century AD is the name Verecundus. On the nearby Pützberg hill and in the vicinity of Gödersheim Castle, Roman skeleton graves and matronae stones from the Roman era were found which were dedicated to the Matronae Veteranehae.

Wollersheim Heath was reputedly the scene of the Battle of Zülpich in AD 496 between the Franks under Clovis I and the Alemanni, although many historians now doubt this. The settlement named by Gregory of Tours as Tulbiac may have been somewhere to the south because there were simply not Alemanni this far north.

Wollersheim was first recorded in 1231 as Wolrisheim. The name is derived from Saint Willibrord. As early as 1184 a ladies house (Frauenhof) is mentioned for the Cologne foundation of St. Maria im Kapitol.

In 1388 the French king, Charles VI and the Duke of Jülich signed the Treaty of Wollersheim (Wollersheimer Frieden) here.

On 1 January 1972 Wollersheim was incorporated into the new borough of Nideggen. According to the decision of the Oberverwaltungsgericht dated 4 August 1972 Wollersheim remained in Nideggen, and temporarily lost the title of "town" (Stadt).

== Church ==
The village has two church buildings, the Old Church, whose oldest parts date to the 11th century, and the New Church of 1900 to 1903.

In 1958 the Old Church was to be dismantled and moved to the open air museum at Kommern. However the villagers opposed this. The Old Church is one of the oldest sacred buildings in the county of Düren.

Wollersheim belongs to the Archdiocese of Cologne.

== Economy ==
Around Wollersheim a lot of Eifel barley is grown for the brewing industry. From 1791 to 1987 the Cramer Brewery brewed beer in Wollersheim itself.
