= Norf =

Norf may refer to:

- Norf station, in Neuss, North Rhine-Westphalia, Germany
- Norfbach, or Norf, a river of North Rhine-Westphalia, Germany
- Northern England
- A nickname for the North Melbourne Football Club, a team in the Australian Football League.

== See also ==
- North (disambiguation)
- "Norf Norf", a 2015 song by Vince Staples
