= Kühlbach =

River in Germany

Location
- Country: Germany
- States: North Rhine-Westphalia

Physical characteristics
- Mouth
  - location: Veybach
  - coordinates: 50.6270°N 6.7152°E

Basin features
- Progression: Veybach→ Erft→ Rhine→ North Sea

Kühlbach is a river within the town area of Mechernich, North Rhine-Westphalia, Germany. It is 7.3 km long and flows into the Veybach as a right tributary near Satzvey. Two other streams within North Rhine-Westphalia are named "Kühlbach".

== See also ==
- List of rivers of North Rhine-Westphalia
