= Düren (district) =

Coordinates: 50°50′N 6°30′E

- District
- Flag Coat of arms
- Country: Germany
- State: North Rhine-Westphalia
- Adm. region: Cologne
- Founded: 1972
- Capital: Düren

Government
  - District admin.: Ralf Nolten since 1st November 2025 (CDU)

Area
  - Total: 941.15 km^{2} (363.38 sq mi)

Population (31 December 2025)
  - Total: 279,492
  - Density: 296.97/km^{2} (769.15/sq mi)
- Time zone: UTC+01:00 (CET)
  - Summer (DST): UTC+02:00 (CEST)
- Vehicle registration: DN, JÜL, MON, SLE
- Website: http://www.kreis-dueren.de

Düren (German pronunciation: [ˈdyːʁən]) is a Kreis (district) in the west of North Rhine-Westphalia, Germany. Neighboring districts are Heinsberg, Neuss, Rhein-Erft-Kreis, Euskirchen and Aachen.

== History ==
The district was created in 1972 by merging the former districts of Jülich and Düren. Both districts date back to 1816 when the new Prussian Rhine Province was created. Before the French Revolutionary and Napoleonic Wars (1794), all of the area belonged to the duchy of Jülich.

== Geography ==
Geographically, it covers both the lowlands of the Lower Rhine Bay as well as the mountains and hills of the Eifel. The district has rich lignite (brown coal) deposits, which is used in open pit mining. Another big industry is paper production, which dates back to the second part of the 16th century. The main river in the district is the Roer. The eastern parts drain into the Erft via Neffelbach and Rotbach.

Parts of the Düren district belong to Eifel National Park.

== Coat of arms ==
The coat of arms shows the lion from the city of Jülich in the upper part. In the bottom it has a paper roll with the capital letter D for Düren, because the paper industry has long history. The coat of arms were granted in 1942.

== Towns and municipalities ==
Clickable map of towns and municipalities in the district

Towns
Municipalities
1. Düren
2. Heimbach
3. Jülich
4. Linnich
5. Nideggen
1. Aldenhoven
2. Hürtgenwald
3. Inden
4. Kreuzau
5. Langerwehe
6. Merzenich
7. Niederzier
8. Nörvenich
9. Titz
10. Vettweiß

== Sister County ==
Düren has a partnership with Dorchester County in Maryland.
