= Kreuzau =

- Municipality
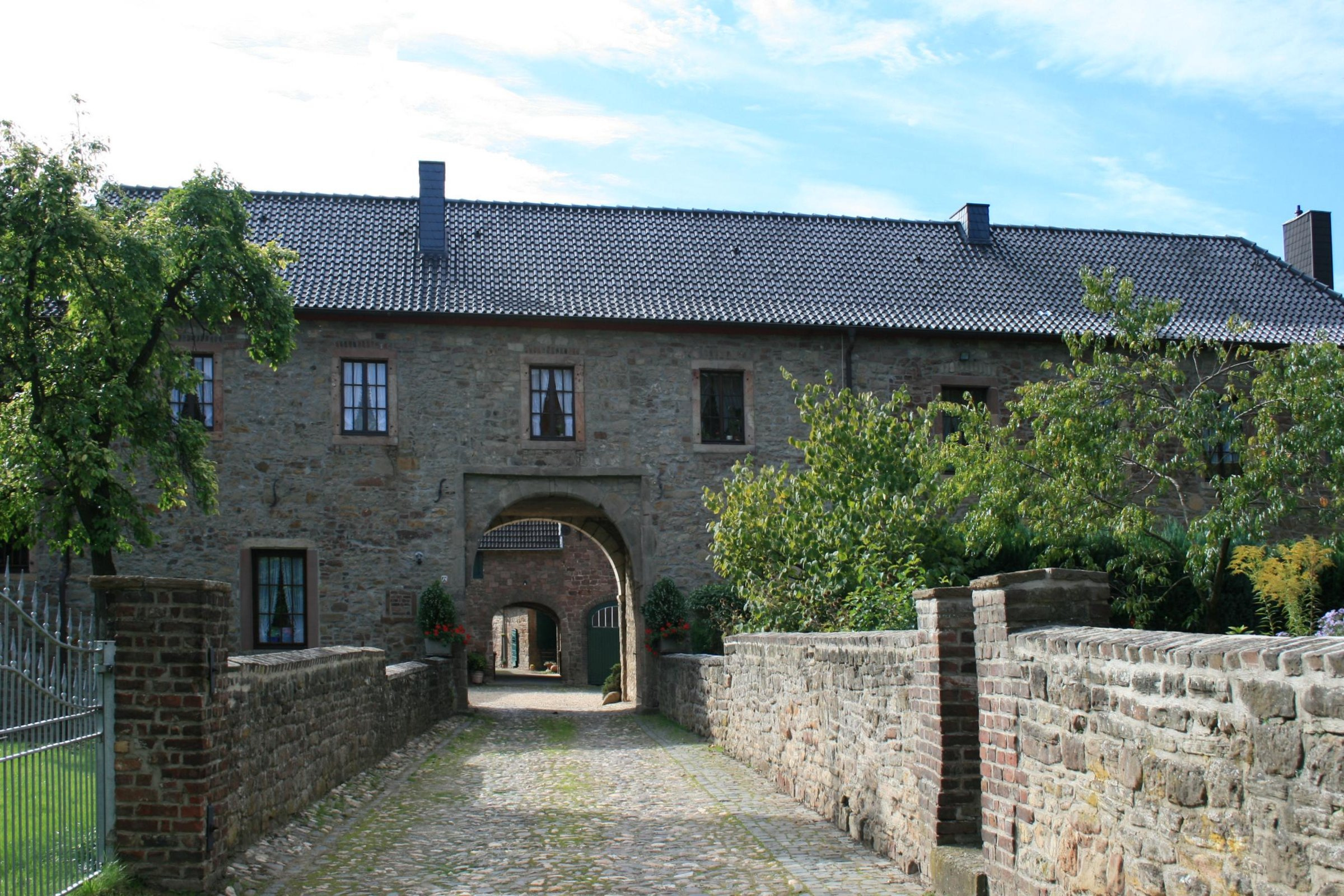
- Kreuzau Castle

- Flag Coat of arms

- Location of Kreuzau within Düren district
- Interactive map of Kreuzau
- Location within Germany Location within North Rhine-Westphalia
- Coordinates: 50°45′00″N 06°28′59″E
- Country: Germany
- State: North Rhine-Westphalia
- Admin. region: Köln
- District: Düren

Government
  - Mayor (2025–30): Ingo Eßer (CDU)

Area
  - Total: 41.73 km^{2} (16.11 sq mi)
- Elevation: 142–360 m (466–1,181 ft)

Population (2025-12-31)
  - Total: 18,204
  - Density: 436.2/km^{2} (1,130/sq mi)
- Time zone: UTC+01:00 (CET)
  - Summer (DST): UTC+02:00 (CEST)
- Postal codes: 52372
- Dialling codes: 02422, 02427, 02421
- Vehicle registration: DN
- Website: www.kreuzau.de

Kreuzau (German pronunciation: [ˈkʁɔʏtsaʊ]) is a municipality in the district of Düren in the state of North Rhine-Westphalia, Germany. It is located on the river Rur, approx. 5 km south of Düren.

== Geography ==
=== Neighbouring communities ===
Kreuzau is surrounded by the following settlements, listed clockwise beginning in the north: the county town of Düren and the municipalities of Nörvenich, Vettweiß, Nideggen and Hürtgenwald, all in the county of Düren.

=== Municipal subdivisions ===
The municipality Kreuzau includes the following civil parishes (Ortsteil):

- Bogheim
- Boich
- Drove
- Kreuzau (incl. Schneidhausen) with 5,150 inhabitants on 31 October 2015
- Leversbach
- Obermaubach (incl. Schlagstein)
- Stockheim
- Thum
- Üdingen
- Untermaubach (incl. Bilstein)
- Winden (incl. Bergheim and Langenbroich)

In addition there was the now extinct village of Hemgenberg.

== Population ==
Historical population

Year	Pop.	±% p.a.
1965	11,653	—
1970	12,565	+1.52%
1975	13,569	+1.55%
1980	14,170	+0.87%
1985	14,367	+0.28%
1990	15,644	+1.72%
1995	16,989	+1.66%

Year	Pop.	±% p.a.
2000	18,192	+1.38%
2005	18,203	+0.01%
2010	17,717	−0.54%
2015	17,441	−0.31%
2020	17,422	−0.02%
2025	18,204	+0.88%

Source: Landesdatabank Nordrhein-Westfalen

== Twin towns ==
Kreuzau is twinned with:

- Obervellach, Austria
- Plancoët, France
