= Reitler =

Reitler is a German surname. Notable people with the surname include:

- Anna Reitler (1894–1948), German politician and member of the Reichstag
- Josef Reitler (1883–1948), Austrian music critic and music educator
- Rudolf Reitler (1865–1917), Austrian physician and psychoanalyst

== See also ==
- Reitler Kailas & Rosenblatt, American law firm
