= Mitbach =

River in Germany

Location
- Country: Germany
- State: North Rhine-Westphalia

Physical characteristics
- Mouth
  - location: Veybach
  - coordinates: 50.6578°N 6.7869°E
- Length: 4.5 km (2.8 mi)

Basin features
- Progression: Veybach→ Erft→ Rhine→ North Sea

Mitbach is a river of North Rhine-Westphalia, Germany. It has his whole course within the town area of Euskirchen and tributes into the Veybach.

== See also ==
- List of rivers of North Rhine-Westphalia
