= Inden, North Rhine-Westphalia =

Inden
- Municipality
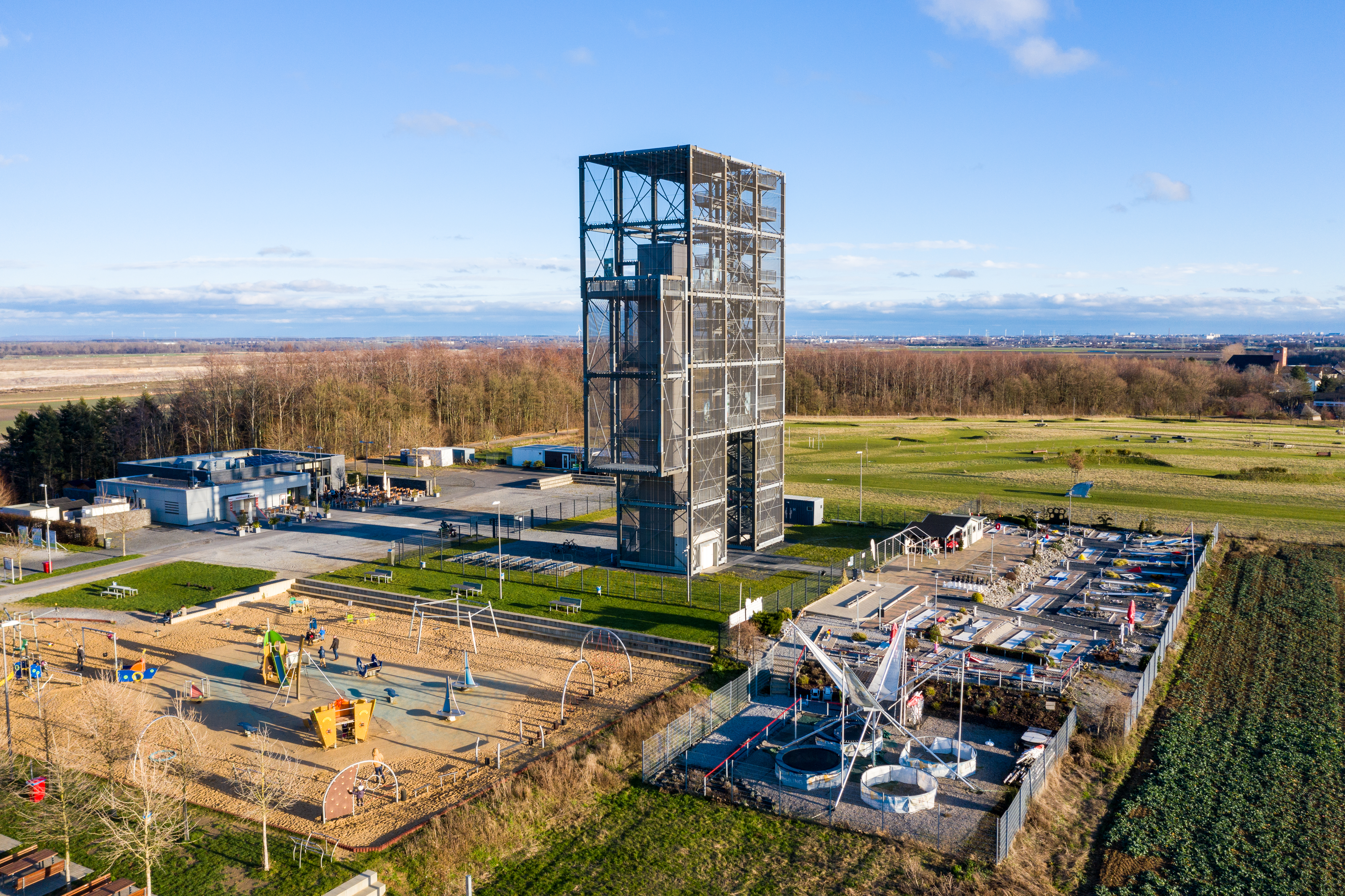

- Flag Coat of arms

- Location of Inden within Düren district
- Interactive map of Inden
- Location within Germany Location within North Rhine-Westphalia
- Coordinates: 50°50′48″N 06°21′28″E
- Country: Germany
- State: North Rhine-Westphalia
- Admin. region: Köln
- District: Düren
- Subdivisions: 7

Government
  - Mayor (2020–25): Stefan Pfennings

Area
  - Total: 35.92 km^{2} (13.87 sq mi)
- Elevation: 106 m (348 ft)

Population (2025-12-31)
  - Total: 7,572
  - Density: 210.8/km^{2} (546.0/sq mi)
- Time zone: UTC+01:00 (CET)
  - Summer (DST): UTC+02:00 (CEST)
- Postal codes: 52459
- Dialling codes: 02465
- Vehicle registration: DN
- Website: www.gemeinde-inden.de

Inden (German pronunciation: [ˈɪndn̩]) is a municipality in the district of Düren in the state of North Rhine-Westphalia, Germany. It is located on the river Inde, approx. 10 km north-west of Düren. In the area around Inden lignite is extracted in open-pit mines. One mine is being rehabilitated with lake, park, solar power and energy storage. Several hundreds of inhabitants have been resettled in the 1990s and 2000s because of these activities.

== Town division ==
Districts:

- Frenz
- Inden/Altdorf
- Lamersdorf
- Lucherberg
- Schophoven
- Viehöven

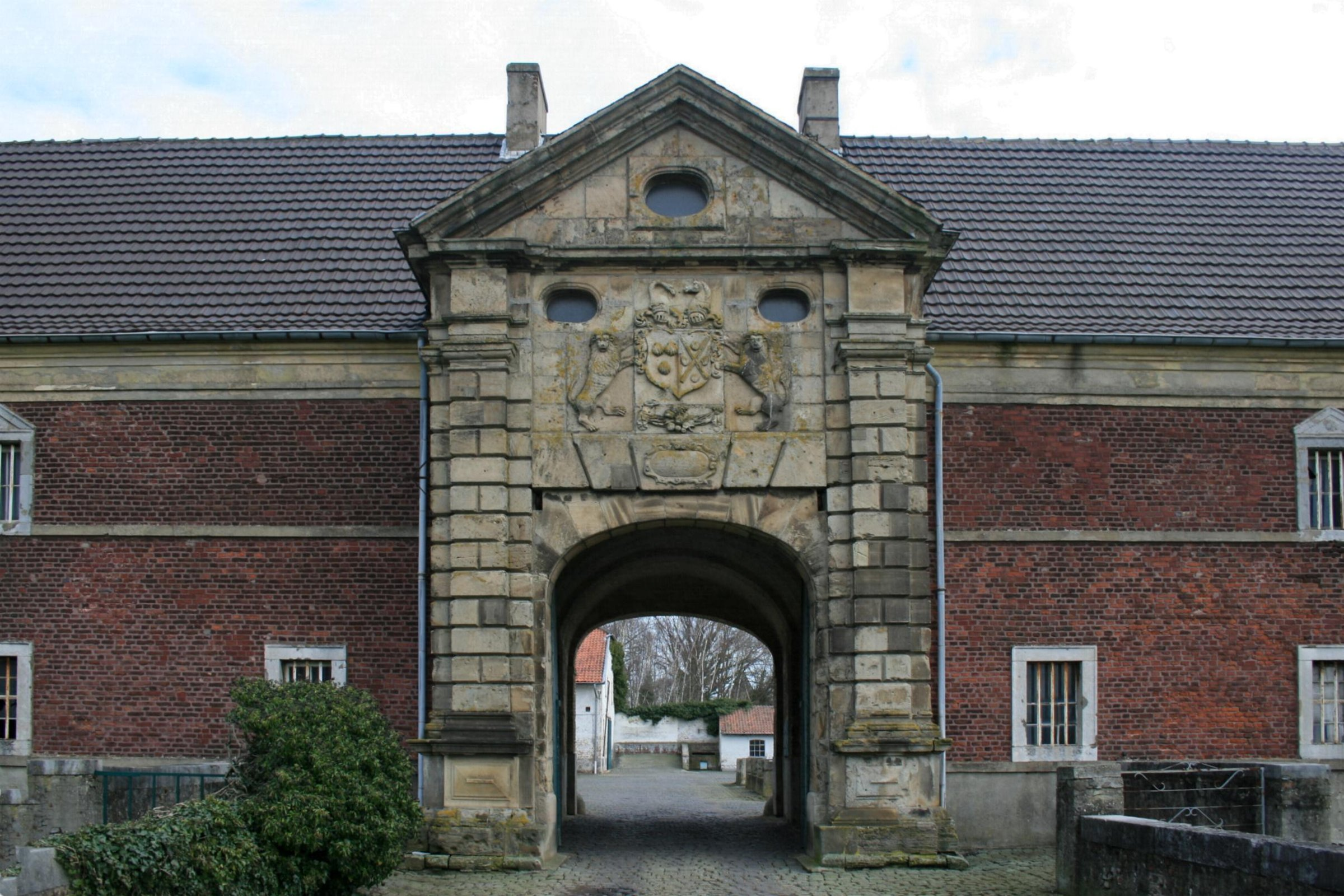
Entrance to Burg Müllenark, Schophoven

Former, dredged districts:

- Altdorf
- Geuenich
- Inden (old-Inden)
- Pier
- Pommenich
- Vilvenich

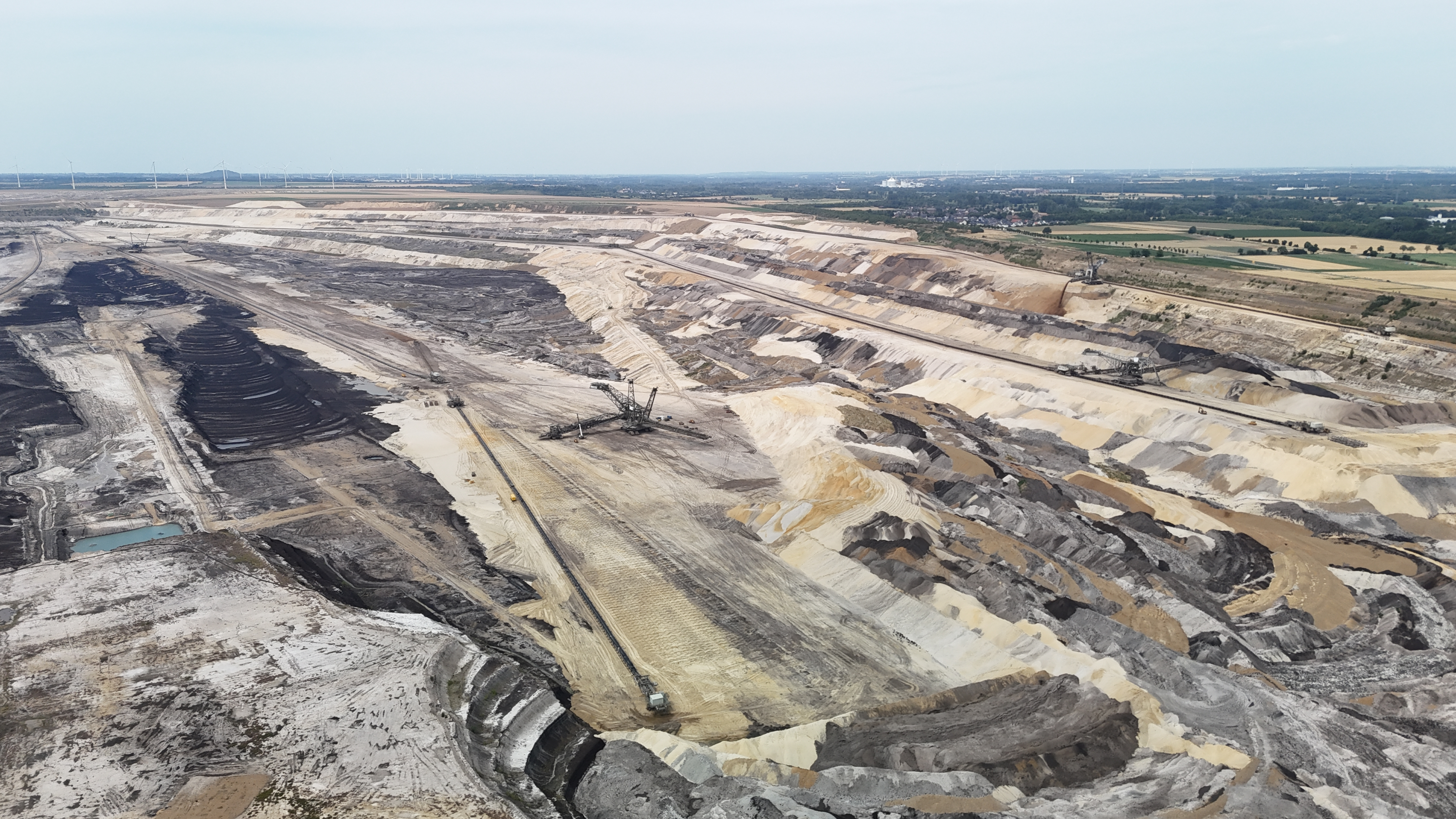
Inden surface mine

== Population ==
Historical population

Year	Pop.	±% p.a.
1965	8,284	—
1970	8,306	+0.05%
1975	8,109	−0.48%
1980	7,938	−0.43%
1985	7,664	−0.70%
1990	7,933	+0.69%
1995	7,624	−0.79%

Year	Pop.	±% p.a.
2000	7,648	+0.06%
2005	7,533	−0.30%
2010	6,853	−1.87%
2015	7,272	+1.19%
2020	7,480	+0.57%
2025	7,572	+0.24%

Source: Landesdatabank Nordrhein-Westfalen
