= Erp (Germany) =

Village in Erftstadt, North Rhine-Westphalia, Germany

Coordinates: 50°46′N 6°43′E

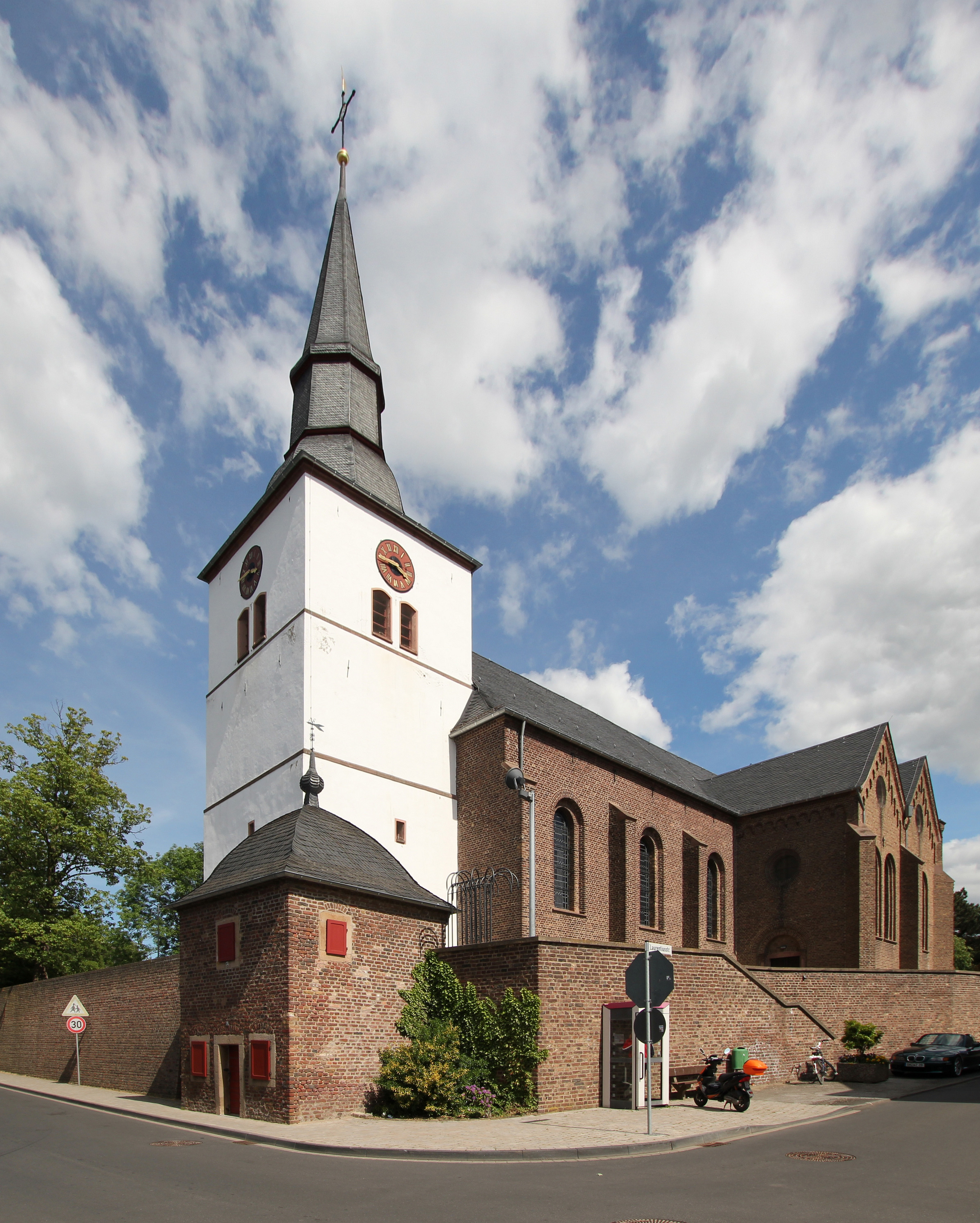
St. Pantaleon's church in the centre of the village

Erp is a village in Erftstadt, North Rhine-Westphalia, Germany. It had about 2650 inhabitants in 2006.

== Location and appearance ==
Erp is located 25 km south-west of Cologne in an open and flat landscape about 125 metres above sea level. The municipal territory covers 1630 ha. The soil is a rich loess. The land outside the village is entirely used for agricultural purposes, with sugar beet, wheat, barley and potatoes being the main products. A small brook, the Erpa, rises a few hundred meters west of the village and flows through it in an easterly direction.

Erp's widely visible landmark is the high white tower of St. Pantaleon's church in the centre of the village. A large number of farm houses and buildings, many of which have been transformed into accommodation over the last years, still characterise the appearance of the village. A green band of meadows and gardens on both sides of the Erpa runs through the old centre. Many new buildings – mostly detached houses – built as of the 1960s around the old centre complete the picture.

== History ==
The oldest traces of human settlement in the municipal territory go back to prehistoric times. The names of the village and of the brook Erp/Erpa are of pre-Germanic origin (from "Erl-Apa", which means "running water"). They indicate that the place has been inhabited continuously for more than 2000 years.

Various objects from Roman times (coins, pots, bricks) were discovered in and around the village. A visible trace of these times is the Roman road between Cologne and Trier, which runs through the south of the municipal territory. In the present day its straight route is still used as a track across the fields.

In 1140 Erp was mentioned in a document for the first time. In the Middle Ages Erp lay in the territory of the archbishop and electoral prince of Cologne. However, the Counts of Schleiden residing in the town of the same name in the nearby mountains of the Eifel and as of 1451 their successors, the Counts of Manderscheid-Blankenheim, held the power in the village. In these times almost the entire population of the village worked in the agricultural sector. During the Thirty Years' War in February 1642, Erp was completely destroyed (except for one house) by French and Hessian troupes. During the long reign (1644–1684) of Count Salentin Ernst of Manderscheid-Blankenheim the village was slowly rebuilt.

The old feudal system disappeared with the arrival of French troops in October 1794. The French made Erp a municipality (in French: “mairie”) as part of the French administration. After the official recognition of the annexation of the Rhineland in the Treaty of Lunéville in 1801 Erp became French; a situation that should last until 1814. The French period had important consequences for the village. The big farms which had been owned for centuries by nobles, monasteries or other religious institutions were sold by auction and became property of private persons. Moreover, the legal and administrative system changed completely.

In 1815 the Prussians followed the French. They retained – except for the language and some smaller modifications here and there - the legal and administrative system introduced by the French. Erp remained a municipality in the district of Lechenich, which became district of Euskirchen in 1827. This administrative structure should stay for almost 150 years.

In the end of the 19th century the industrialisation started to change the rhythm of life in Erp which had been determined by the agriculture for centuries. The quarrying of brown coal in the nearby area of the Ville, a low ridge west of Cologne, and around Zülpich offered jobs for the local population outside of the agriculture. Moreover, in 1894 Erp got a rail way station, which allowed the transport of agricultural products beyond the immediate surroundings. This was also the beginning of the cultivation of sugar beets in Erp which is still the main pillar of its agriculture.

During a bomb attack on 30 November 1944 a large part of the village was severely damaged. In the beginning of March 1945 Erp was taken by American troops. Subsequently, Erp became part of the British occupation zone. In August 1946 Erp became part of the new Land North Rhine-Westphalia (in German: “Nordrhein-Westfalen”).

In 1969, the municipality of Erp was integrated in the newly created town of Erftstadt, a merger of a small town and several villages right and left of the river Erft. In 1975, Erftstadt was cut from the district of Euskirchen and attached to the newly created Erft-district, which was renamed into Rhein-Erft-district (in German: Rhein-Erft-Kreis) in 2003.

== Bibliography ==
- Albert Esser: Die Geschichte des Dorfes Erp. 1969.
- Everhard Ismar: Geschichte der Pfarre und Kirche St. Pantaleon Erp. Erp 1994
- Horst Matzerath (ed.): Auf dem Weg zur Erftstadt - Politik und Verwaltung im 19. und 20. Jahrhundert, mit Beiträgen von Frank Bartsch, Horst Matzerath, Ralf Othengrafen. Schriften des Geschichtsvereins Erftstadt, Band 2. ISBN 9783921300503, 2015
- Bernhard Schreiber: Archäologische Funde und Denkmäler des erftstädtischen Raumes. Erftstadt 1999
- Karl Stommel: Die französischen Einwohnerlisten aus Erftstadt. Stadt Erftstadt 1989
- Karl und Hanna Stommel: Quellen zur Geschichte der Stadt Erftstadt Band 1–5. Erftstadt 1990–1998
- Hans Welters: Erp, ein alter Dorfplan erzählt. In: Heimatkalender des Kreises Euskirchen. 1955.
