= Veybach =

River in Germany

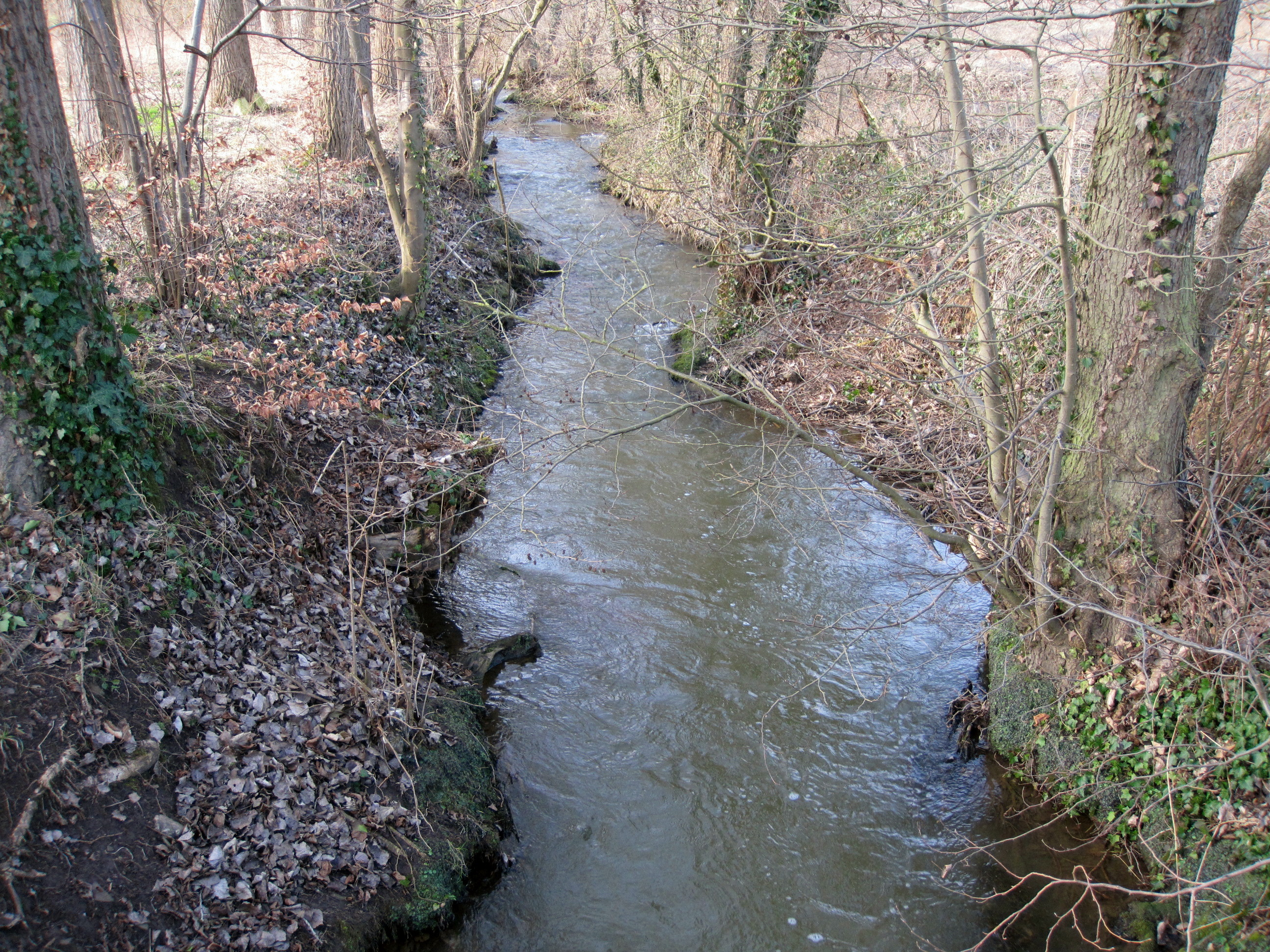

Location
- Country: Germany
- State: North Rhine-Westphalia

Physical characteristics
- Mouth
  - location: Erft
  - coordinates: 50.6703°N 6.7949°E

Basin features
- Progression: Erft→ Rhine→ North Sea

Veybach is a river of North Rhine-Westphalia, Germany. It is 22.9 km (14.2 mi) long and flows into the Erft as a left tributary within the town areas of Mechernich and Euskirchen. The Mitbach and the Kühlbach belong to its tributaries.

== See also ==
- List of rivers of North Rhine-Westphalia
