= Gillbach =

River in Germany

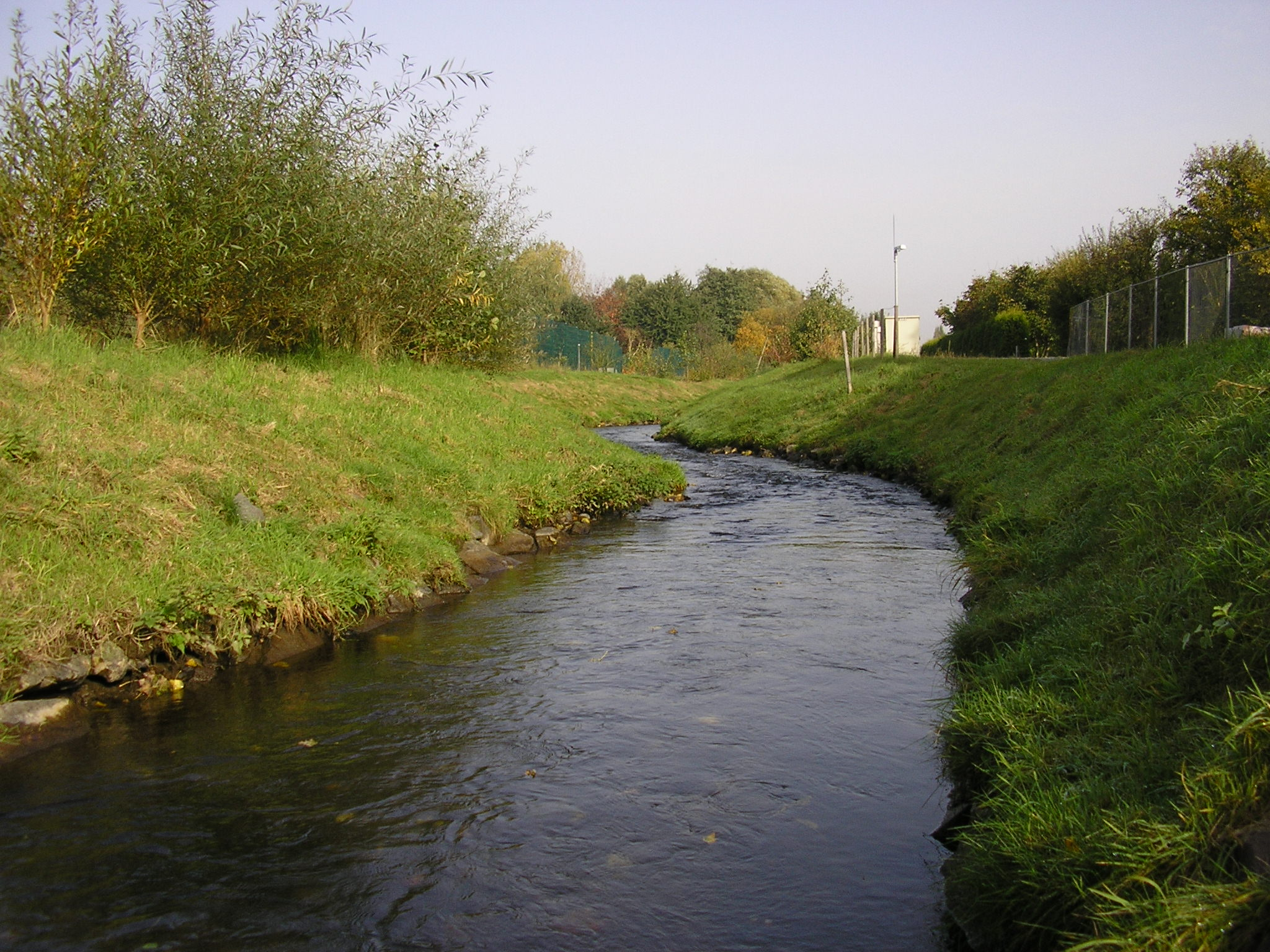

Location
- Country: Germany
- State: North Rhine-Westphalia

Physical characteristics
- Mouth
  - location: Erft
  - coordinates: 51.1604°N 6.6889°E
- Length: 28.5 km (17.7 mi)

Basin features
- Progression: Erft→ Rhine→ North Sea

The stream Gillbach is a tributary to the Erft in North Rhine-Westphalia, Germany. With a length of 28.5 kilometres it flows through the cities of Bergheim, Grevenbroich, and Neuss. At the source the Gillbach provides cooling water for the Niederaussem Power Station. As a consequence, the stream is much warmer than most other streams in Central Europe and even hosts tropical fish species like guppies or convict cichlids that have been released by private pet holders.

== See also ==
- List of rivers of North Rhine-Westphalia
