= Anna Reitler =

German politician (1894–1948)

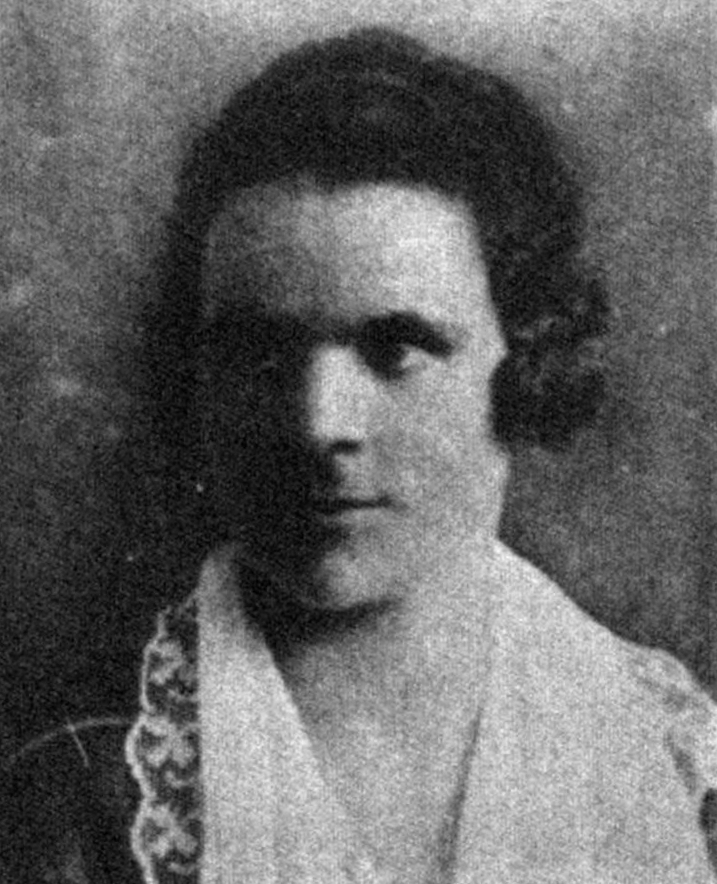
Reitler c. 1924

Anna Reitler (born Anna Schnitzler: 3 June 1894 - 23 June 1948) was a German politician (KPD).

== Life ==
Anna Schnitzler was born into a working-class family in Liblar (now part of Erftstadt), a small town to the southwest of Cologne, in the Prussian Rhine Province. She attended junior school locally after which she went into domestic service. At some stage she moved to the city, Cologne, and it was here that she married.

In 1918 Anna Reitler became a member of the recently formed Independent Social Democratic Party ("Unabhängige Sozialdemokratische Partei Deutschlands" / USPD). The party had been created the previous year as a result of a split in the more mainstream Social Democratic Party, primarily over the issue of whether or not to continue to vote in support of financing the war. Two years later the USPD itself broke apart, and Reitler was part of the left-wing majority that now joined the Communist Party. Within the party she undertook various unpaid functions, and became the long-standing head of its women's section, for the Middle-Rhine regional party leadership ("Bezirksleitung Mittelrhein"). She also took temporary responsibility for the party's Cologne newspaper, "Sozialistische Republik".

Anna Reitler was a delegate to the eighth party congress at the end of 1923, and in May 1924 she stood successfully as a communist party candidate for election to the national parliament (Reichstag). 1924 was a crisis year, marked by economic collapse, destitution and two general elections, but Anna Reitler was not re-elected in the December election of that year. She subsequently played no further part in politics, even after 1945.

Anna Reitler died in Markkleeberg (on the southern edge of Leipzig) on 23 June 1948.
