= Norfbach =

River in Germany

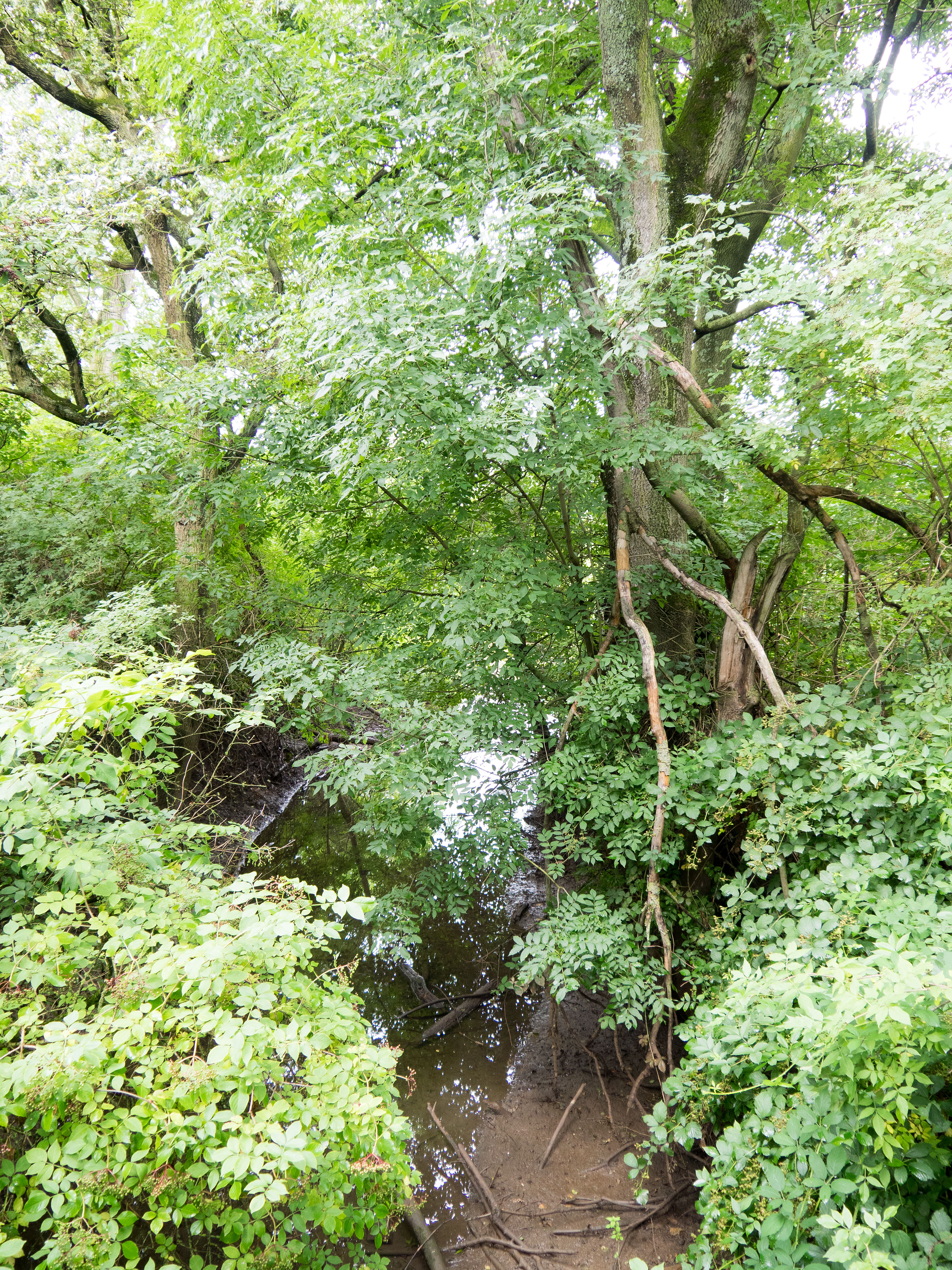

Location
- Country: Germany
- State: North Rhine-Westphalia

Physical characteristics
- Mouth
  - location: Erft
  - coordinates: 51.1739°N 6.7251°E
- Length: 19.9 km (12.4 mi)

Basin features
- Progression: Erft→ Rhine→ North Sea

Norfbach (also: Norf) is a river of North Rhine-Westphalia, Germany. It flows within the town areas of Rommerskirchen and Neuss, and tributes the Erft.

== See also ==
- List of rivers of North Rhine-Westphalia
