= Erftstadt =

- Town
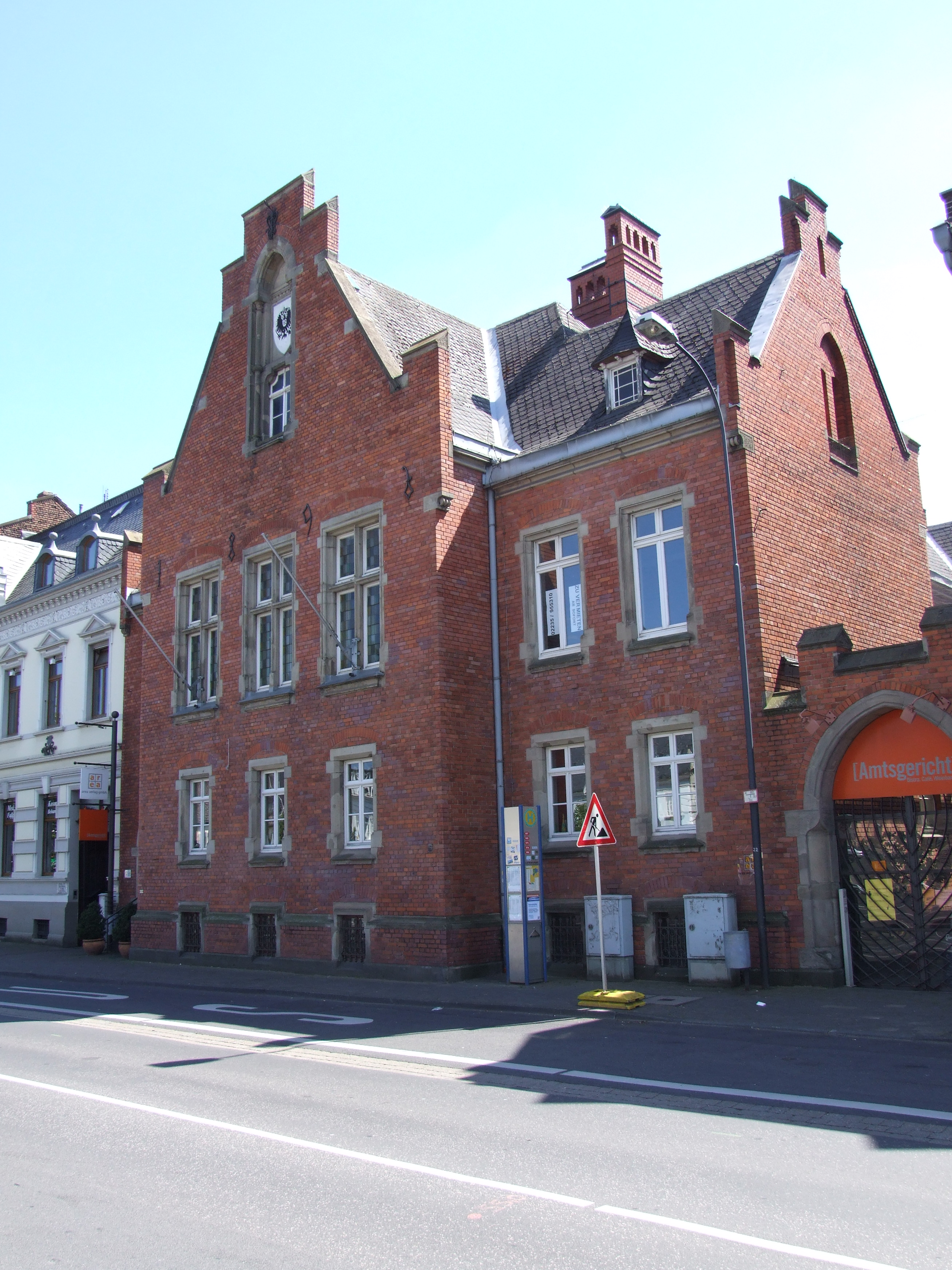
- The old courthouse in Erftstadt-Lechenich

- Coat of arms

- Location of Erftstadt within Rhein-Erft-Kreis district
- Interactive map of Erftstadt
- Location within Germany Location within North Rhine-Westphalia
- Coordinates: 50°49′N 6°46′E
- Country: Germany
- State: North Rhine-Westphalia
- Admin. region: Cologne
- District: Rhein-Erft-Kreis
- Subdivisions: 18

Government
  - Mayor (2020–25): Carolin Weitzel (CDU)

Area
  - Total: 119.89 km^{2} (46.29 sq mi)
- Elevation: 100 m (330 ft)

Population (2025-12-31)
  - Total: 48,724
  - Density: 406.41/km^{2} (1,052.6/sq mi)
- Time zone: UTC+01:00 (CET)
  - Summer (DST): UTC+02:00 (CEST)
- Postal codes: 50374
- Dialling codes: 02235
- Vehicle registration: BM
- Website: www.erftstadt.de

Erftstadt (German pronunciation: [ˈɛʁftˌʃtat]) is a town located about 20 km south-west of Cologne in the Rhein-Erft-Kreis, state of North Rhine-Westphalia, Germany. It was created in July 1969 by the merger of the town Lechenich and the municipalities Dorweiler, Erp, Pingsheim, Bliesheim, Kierdorf, Liblar, Dirmerzheim, Gymnich, Borr, Friesheim, Niederberg and Wissersheim. The name of the town derives from the river that flows through it, the Erft.

In 1977, the RAF held their hostage, Hanns-Martin Schleyer, captive in a flat in Liblar for about a month.

A landslide during the 2021 European floods led to the collapse of several houses.

== Coat of arms ==

In green are one silver/white left flank bar and on the right border of the shield two golden/yellow squares. The green ground expresses the nature and the health. The silver flank bar represents the river Erft. The right side looks like an "E" for Erftstadt. The yellow squares represent the biggest villages Lechenich and Liblar. The coat of arms was designed by Josef Günterberg from Berlin. The town got it as an official coat of arms on 15 March 1974.

== Geography ==
Erftstadt is located 25 km north-west of Bonn. Its height ranges from 81 to 151 metres above sea level. The following towns and municipalities border on Erftstadt:

- Kerpen
- Hürth
- Brühl
- Weilerswist
- Zülpich
- Vettweiß
- Nörvenich

=== Boroughs of Erftstadt ===
The town of Erftstadt consists of the following 14 Stadtbezirke (in brackets: population, 2023/03/01)

- Ahrem (1,176)
- Blessem and Frauenthal (1,641)
- Bliesheim (3,721)
- Borr and Scheuren(366)
- Dirmerzheim (2,223)
- Erp (2,665)
- Friesheim (3,070)
- Gymnich and Mellerhöfe (5,003)
- Herrig (552)
- Kierdorf (3,163)
- Köttingen (3,584)
- Lechenich and Konradsheim (11,503)
- Liblar (13,365)
- Niederberg (542)

Most of the town administration is in Liblar, the most populous Stadtbezirk. The second-most populous Stadtbezirk is Lechenich.

== Population ==
Historical population

Year	Pop.	±% p.a.
1965	28,306	—
1970	35,096	+4.39%
1975	41,021	+3.17%
1980	43,197	+1.04%
1985	44,736	+0.70%
1990	45,403	+0.30%
1995	48,717	+1.42%

Year	Pop.	±% p.a.
2000	50,689	+0.80%
2005	51,122	+0.17%
2010	50,553	−0.22%
2015	49,786	−0.31%
2020	50,060	+0.11%
2025	48,724	−0.54%

Source: Landesdatabank Nordrhein-Westfalen

== Education ==
In Erftstadt are five further schools: two gymnasiums, two Realschulen and one Hauptschule. In Lechenich are the Theodor-Heuss-Schule, the only Hauptschule in Erftstadt. There also are the Realschule Lechenich and the Gymnasium Lechenich. The Realschule "Gottfried-Kinkel-Realschule" and the Gymnasium Ville-Gymnasium are located in Liblar. The only private school in Erftstadt, the Freie Waldorfschule Erftstadt, can be found in Liblar too. It is a primary and a secondary school. There are seven primary schools in Erftstadt:

- Donatus-Schule Liblar
- Erich-Kästner-Schule Bliesheim
- Nordschule Lechenich
- Südschule Lechenich
- Grundschule Gymnich
- St. Barbara-Concordia-Schule Kierdorf
- Janusz-Korczak-Schule Erp

The TH Köln plans to have a new faculty for Spatial development and infrastructure systems in Erftstadt. There is one music school called Bernd-Alois-Zimmermann-Musikschule in Liblar.

== Twin towns – sister cities ==
Erftstadt is twinned with:

- Wokingham, England, United Kingdom (1977)
- Viry-Châtillon, France (1980)
- Jelenia Góra, Poland (1995)
- Ternopil, Ukraine (2023)
- (Germany) Panketal, Brandenburg (1990)

== Notable people ==
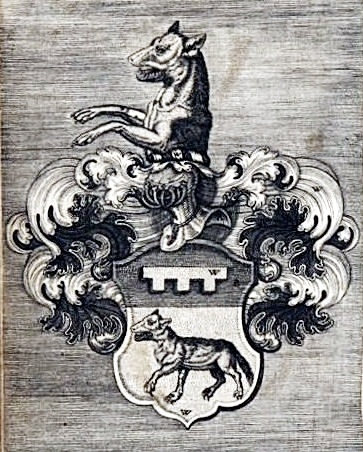
Coat of arms of the family Wolff von Metternich

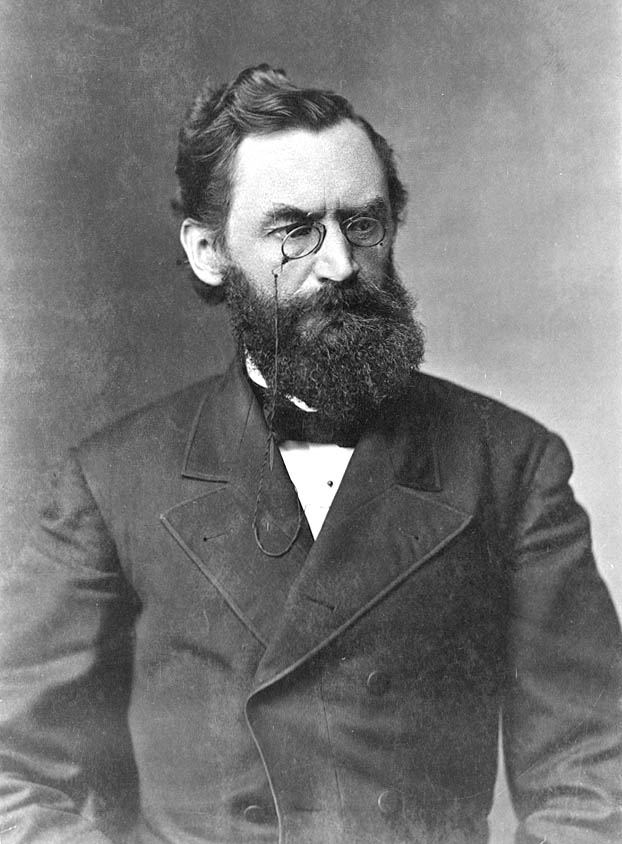
Carl Schurz

- Carl Schurz (1829–1906), politician and first German-born cabinet secretary (Secretary of the Interior 1877–1881) in the US
- Jean Bungartz (1854–1934), animal artist, specialist author, photographer, breeder, lived from 1886 to 1913 in Lechenich

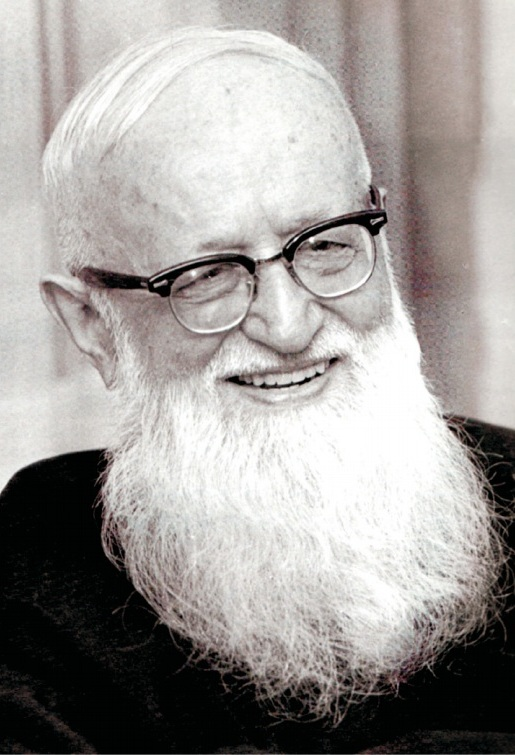
Joseph Kentenich

- Joseph Kentenich (1885–1968), founder of the Schoenstatt Apostolic Movement
- Anna Reitler (1894 – 1948, born in Liblar), politician (KPD), Reichtags deputy
- Bernd Alois Zimmermann (1918–1970), composer, born in Bliesheim

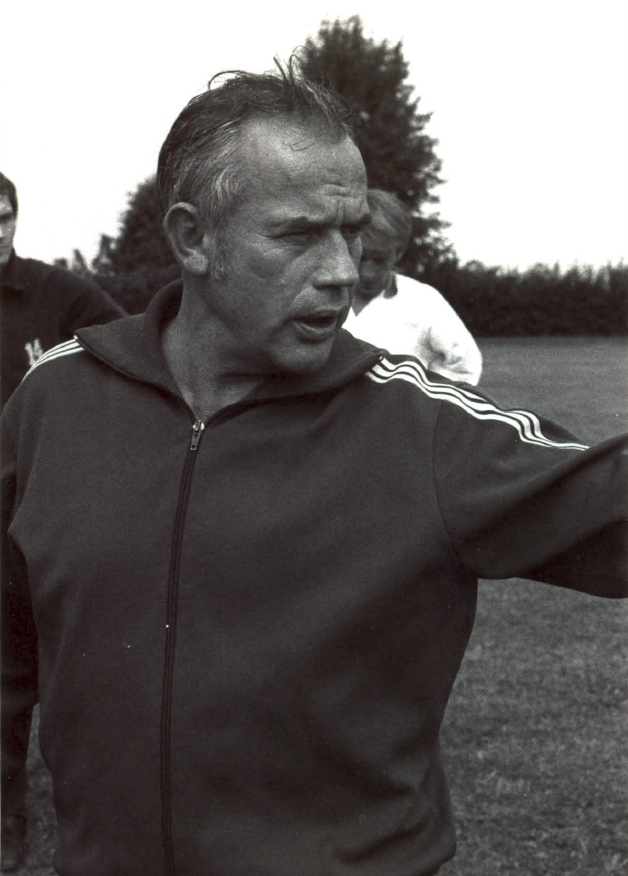
Hennes Weisweiler

- Hennes Weisweiler (1919–1983), football coach, born in Lechenich

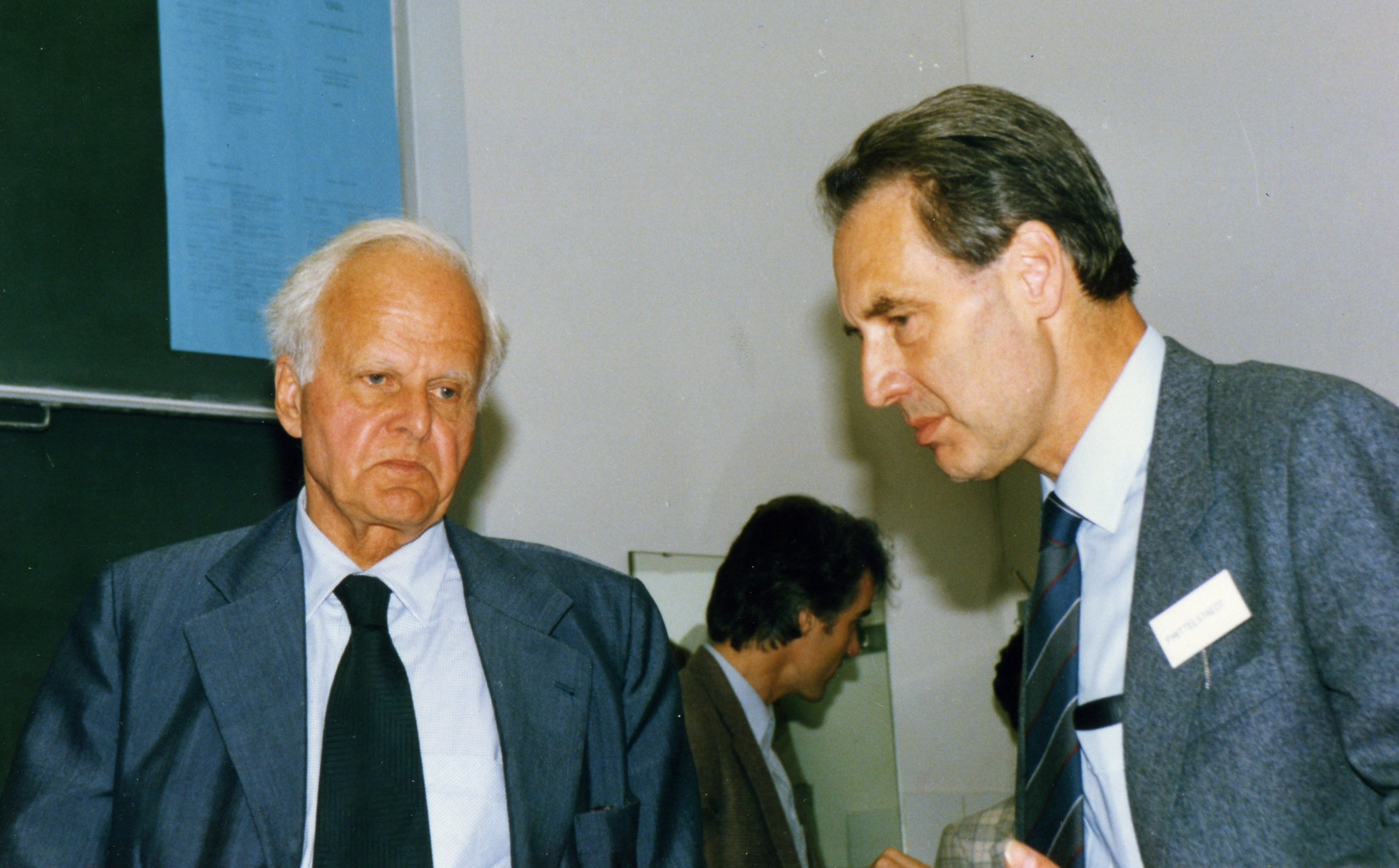
Peter Mittelstaedt (right) with Carl Friedrich von Weizsäcker (left)

- Peter Mittelstaedt:(1929–2014) Physicist, philosopher and science theorist
- Manfred Donike (1933–1995), cyclist, chemist and well-known doping investigator

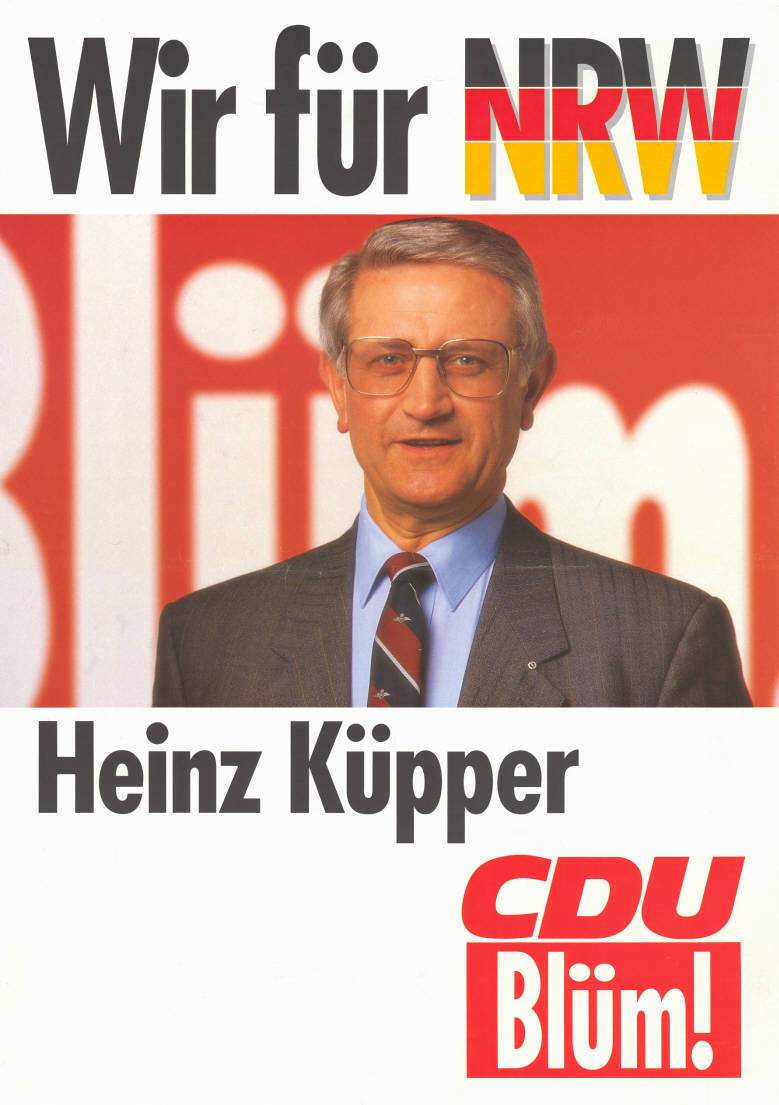
Heinz Küpper, Landtag election 1990

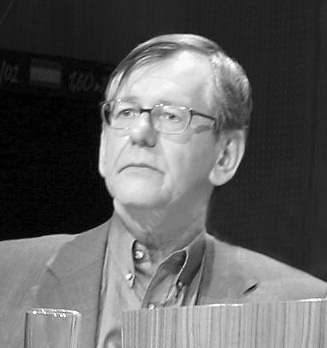
Herbert Feuerstein

- Herbert Feuerstein (1937–2020), satirist and entertainer, lived in Niederberg

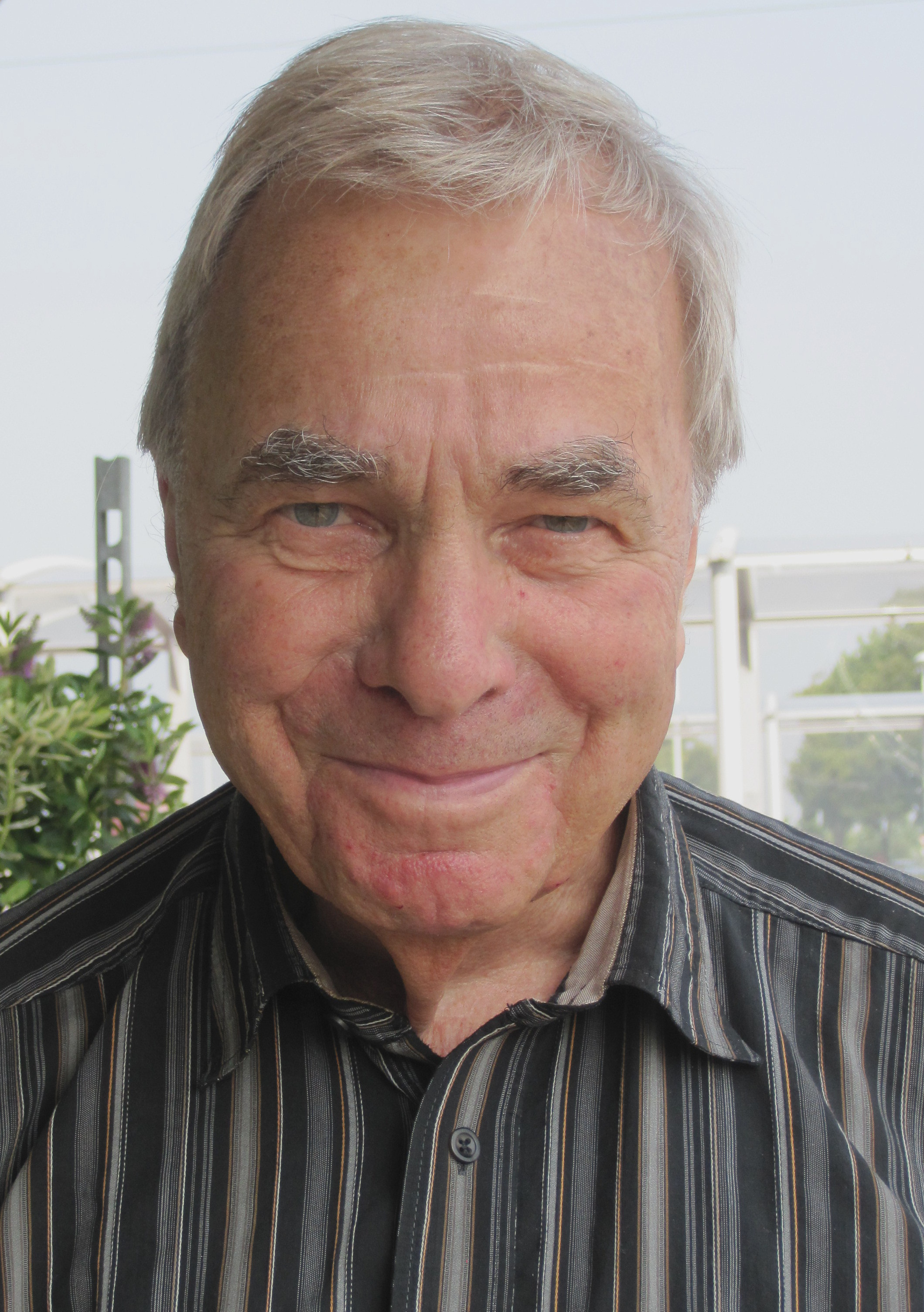
Cornelius Bormann

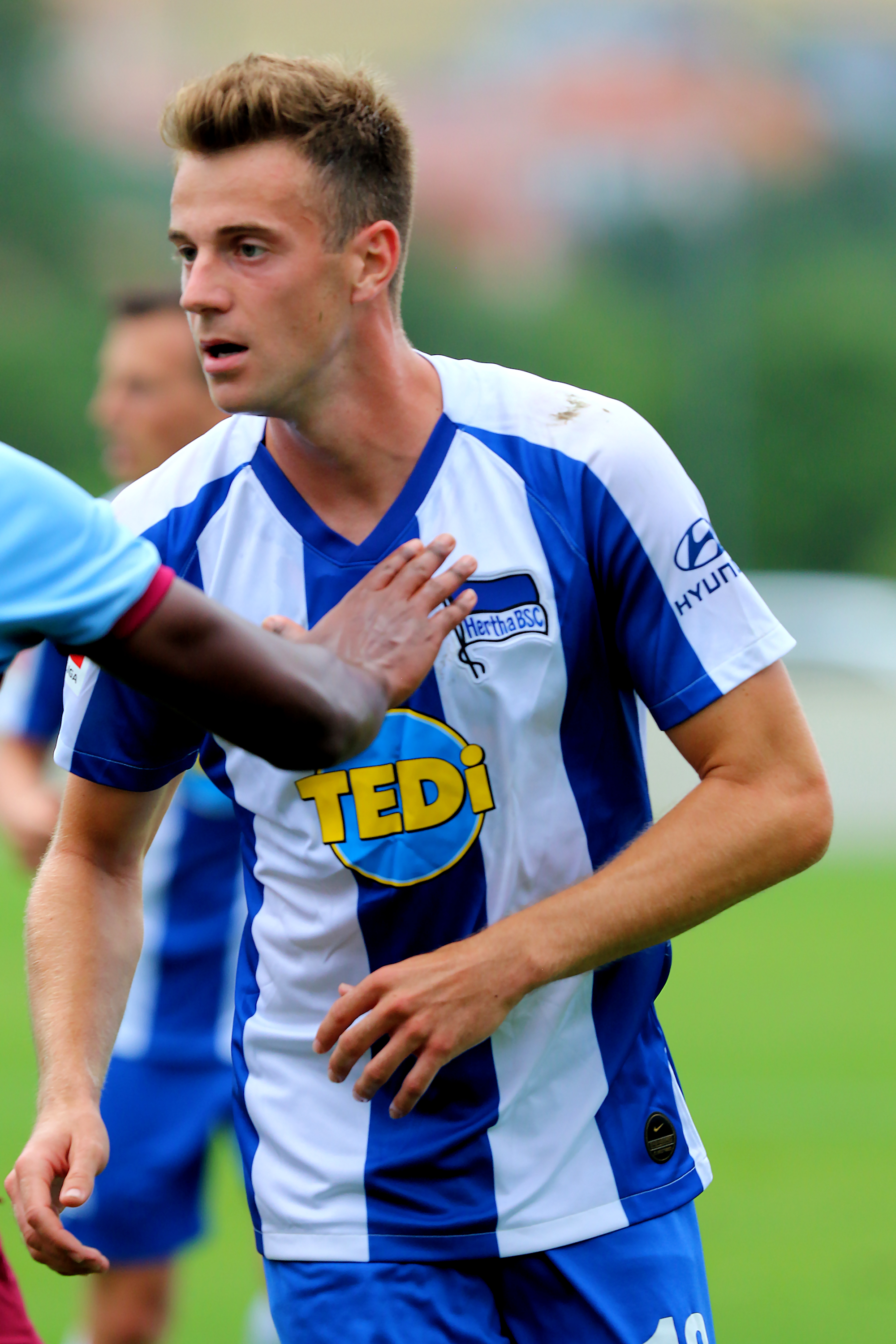
Lukas Klünter (2019)

- Lukas Klünter (born 1996), football player, lives in Friesheim
- Ismail Jakobs (born 1996), football player, lives in Liblar
