= Rotbach (Biberach an der Riss) =

River in Baden-Württemberg, Germany

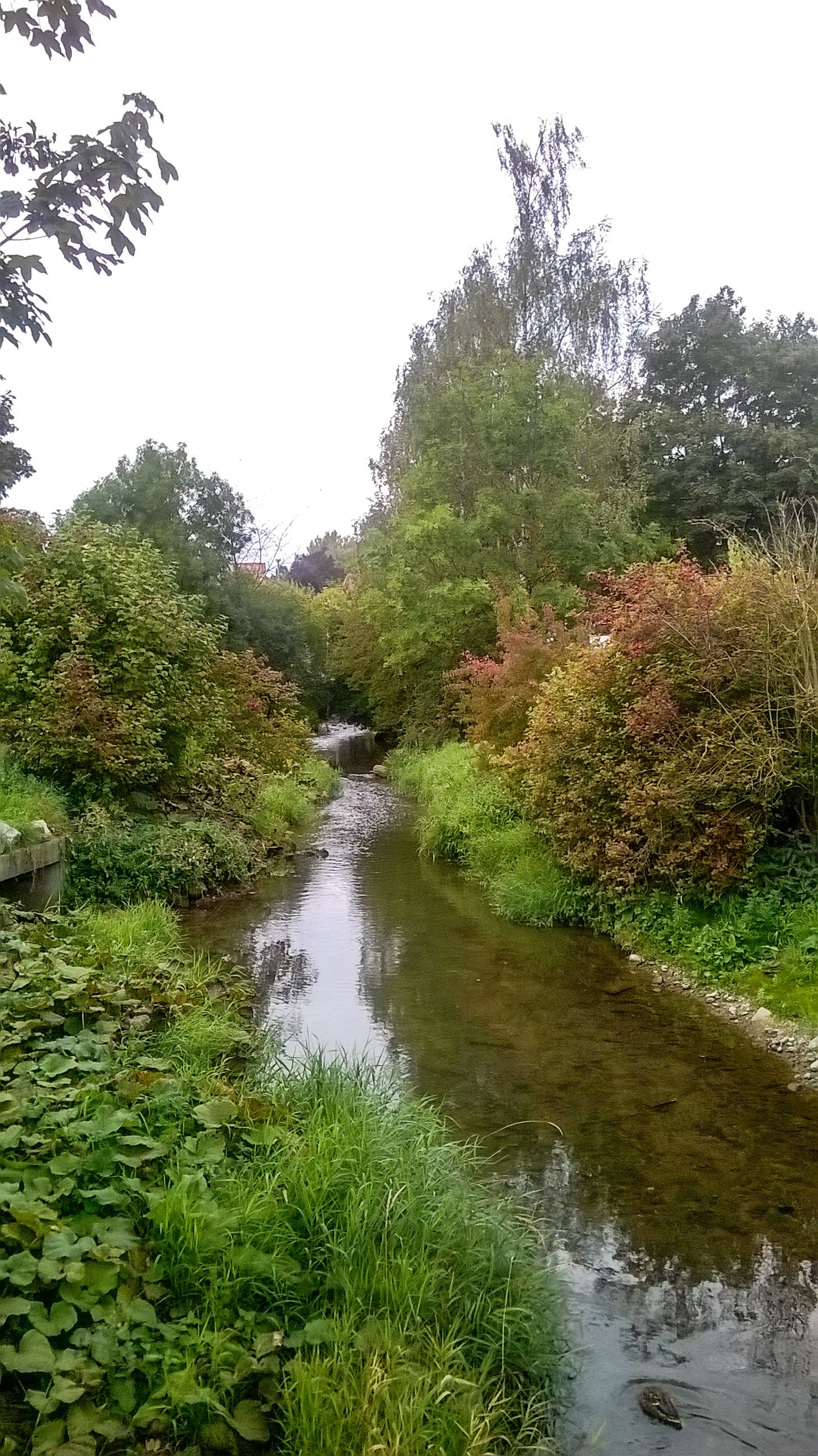

Location
- Country: Germany
- State: Baden-Württemberg

Physical characteristics
- Mouth
  - location: Riss
  - coordinates: 48.0992°N 9.7951°E
- Length: 15.2 km (9.4 mi)

Basin features
- Progression: Riss→ Danube→ Black Sea

Rotbach is a river of Baden-Württemberg, Germany. It is a left tributary of the Riss; the confluence is in the town of Biberach an der Riss.

== See also ==
- List of rivers of Baden-Württemberg
