= Neffelbach =

River in Germany

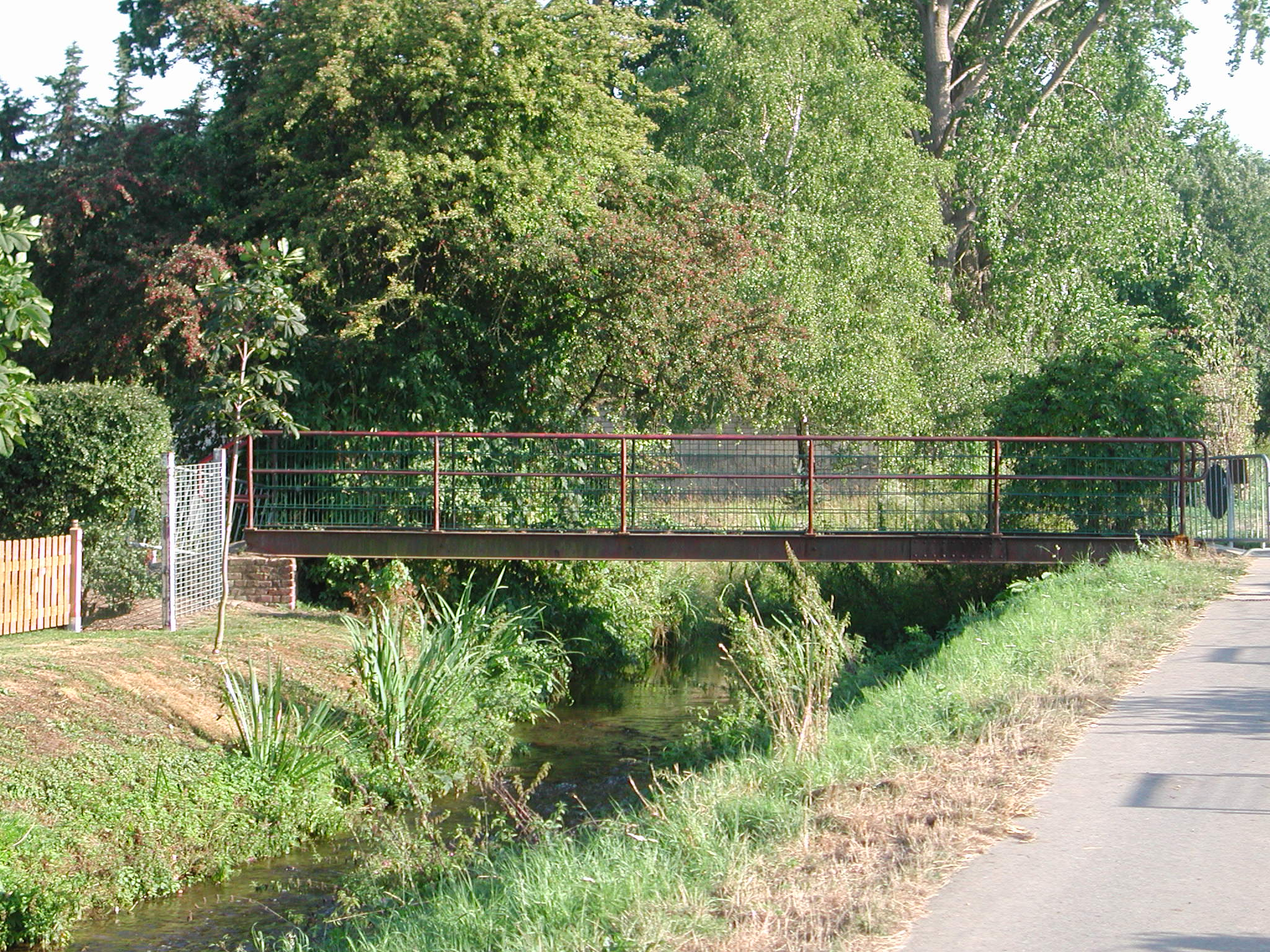

Location
- Country: Germany
- State: North Rhine-Westphalia

Physical characteristics
- Mouth
  - location: Erft
  - coordinates: 50.8927°N 6.7113°E
- Length: 40.3 km (25.0 mi)
- Basin size: 237 km^{2} (92 sq mi)

Basin features
- Progression: Erft→ Rhine→ North Sea

Neffelbach is a river of North Rhine-Westphalia, Germany. Its source is located less than 1 km west of Vlatten, 1,5 km east of Hausen, within the area of Heimbach, neaqr the town border to Nideggen. Also the town areas of Zülpich, Vettweiß and Nörvenich are reached. It flows into the Erft within the town area of Kerpen.

== See also ==
- List of rivers of North Rhine-Westphalia
