= Rotbach (Rhine) =

River in North Rhine-Westphalia, Germany

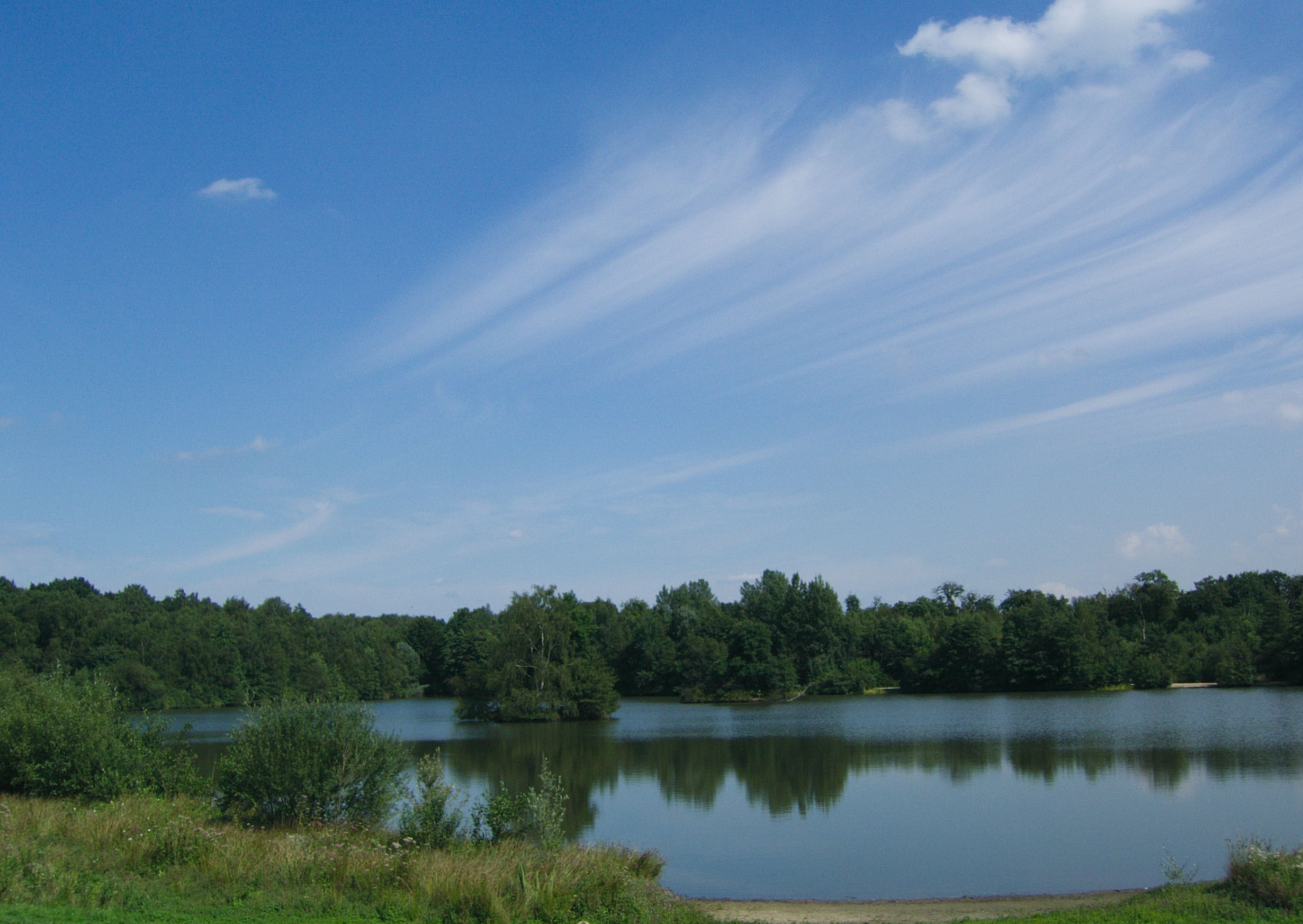

Location
- Country: Germany
- State: North Rhine-Westphalia

Physical characteristics
- Mouth
  - location: Rhine
  - coordinates: 51.5724°N 6.6871°E
- Length: 21.9 km (13.6 mi)

Basin features
- Progression: Rhine→ North Sea

Rotbach is a river of North Rhine-Westphalia, Germany. It is a right tributary of the Rhine in Möllen, near Dinslaken.

== See also ==
- List of rivers of North Rhine-Westphalia
