= Vettweiß =

- Municipality
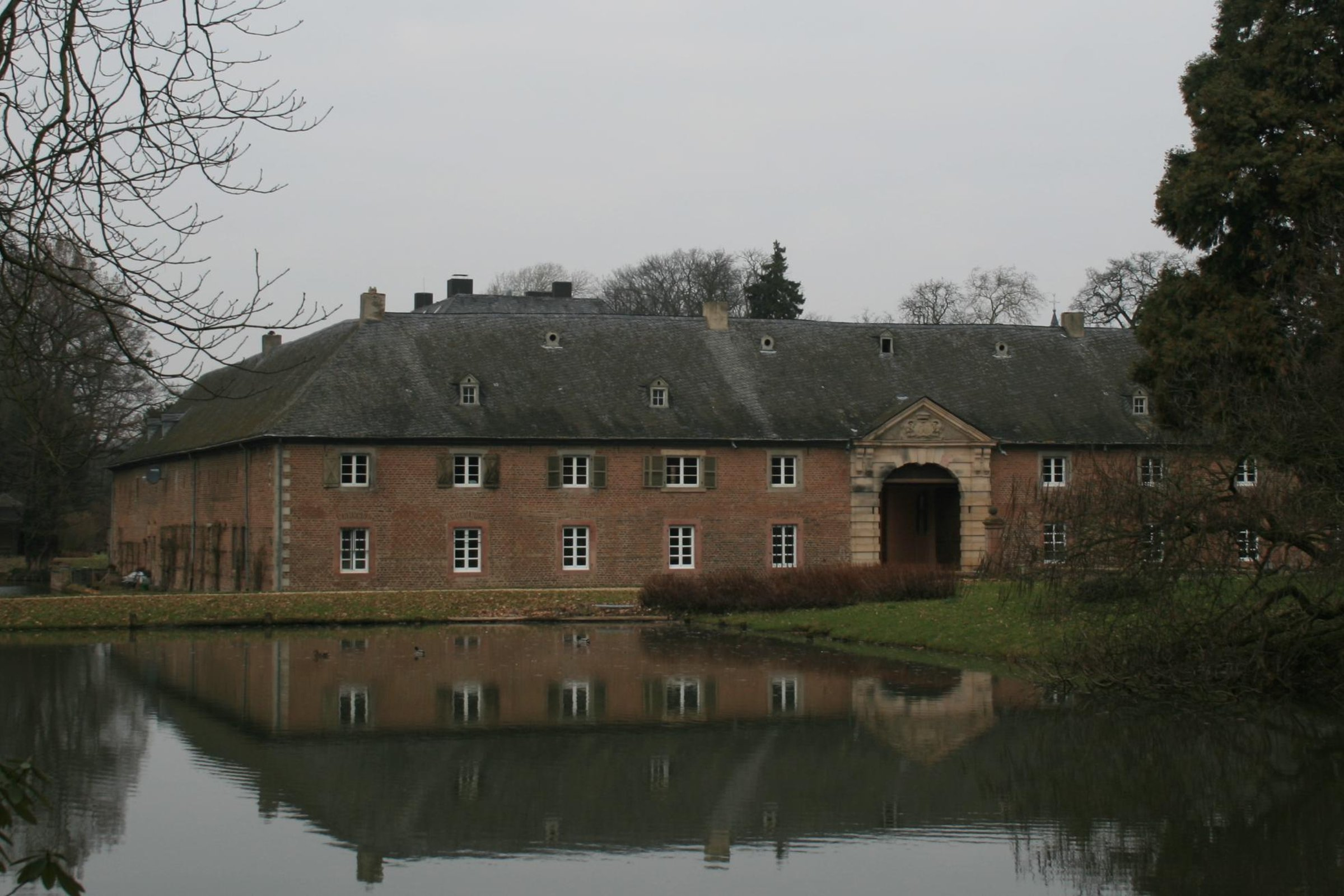

- Coat of arms

- Location of Vettweiß within Düren district
- Interactive map of Vettweiß
- Location within Germany Location within North Rhine-Westphalia
- Coordinates: 50°44′20″N 06°35′50″E
- Country: Germany
- State: North Rhine-Westphalia
- Admin. region: Köln
- District: Düren

Government
  - Mayor (2020–25): Joachim Kunth (CDU)

Area
  - Total: 83.15 km^{2} (32.10 sq mi)
- Elevation: 158 m (518 ft)

Population (2025-12-31)
  - Total: 9,957
  - Density: 119.7/km^{2} (310.1/sq mi)
- Time zone: UTC+01:00 (CET)
  - Summer (DST): UTC+02:00 (CEST)
- Postal codes: 52391
- Dialling codes: 02424, 02425 (Ginnick)
- Vehicle registration: DN
- Website: www.vettweiss.de

Vettweiß (German pronunciation: [ˈfɛtvaɪs]; alternative spelling: Vettweiss) is a municipality in the district of Düren in the state of North Rhine-Westphalia, Germany. It is located approximately 10 km south-east of Düren.

== Division of the municipality ==
Vettweiß consists of 11 villages:

- Vettweiß with Kettenheim
- Froitzheim with Frangenheim
- Ginnick
- Soller
- Jakobwüllesheim
- Kelz
- Lüxheim
- Gladbach with Mersheim
- Müddersheim
- Disternich
- Sievernich

== Population ==
Historical population

Year	Pop.	±% p.a.
1965	6,970	—
1970	7,025	+0.16%
1975	6,993	−0.09%
1980	6,884	−0.31%
1985	6,905	+0.06%
1990	7,182	+0.79%
1995	7,834	+1.75%

Year	Pop.	±% p.a.
2000	8,558	+1.78%
2005	8,939	+0.87%
2010	8,975	+0.08%
2015	9,223	+0.55%
2020	9,527	+0.65%
2025	9,957	+0.89%

Source: Landesdatabank Nordrhein-Westfalen

== Politics ==
=== Town council ===
- CDU: 15 seats (–)
- Bürgerinitiative Vettweiß e.V.: 6 seats (+2)
- SPD: 5 seats (–1)
- Alliance 90/The Greens: 2 seats (-1)

(Elections in September 2025)

=== Mayor ===
Joachim Kunth was elected mayor in September 2015, and re-elected in September 2025.
