= Rotbach (Erft) =

River in Germany

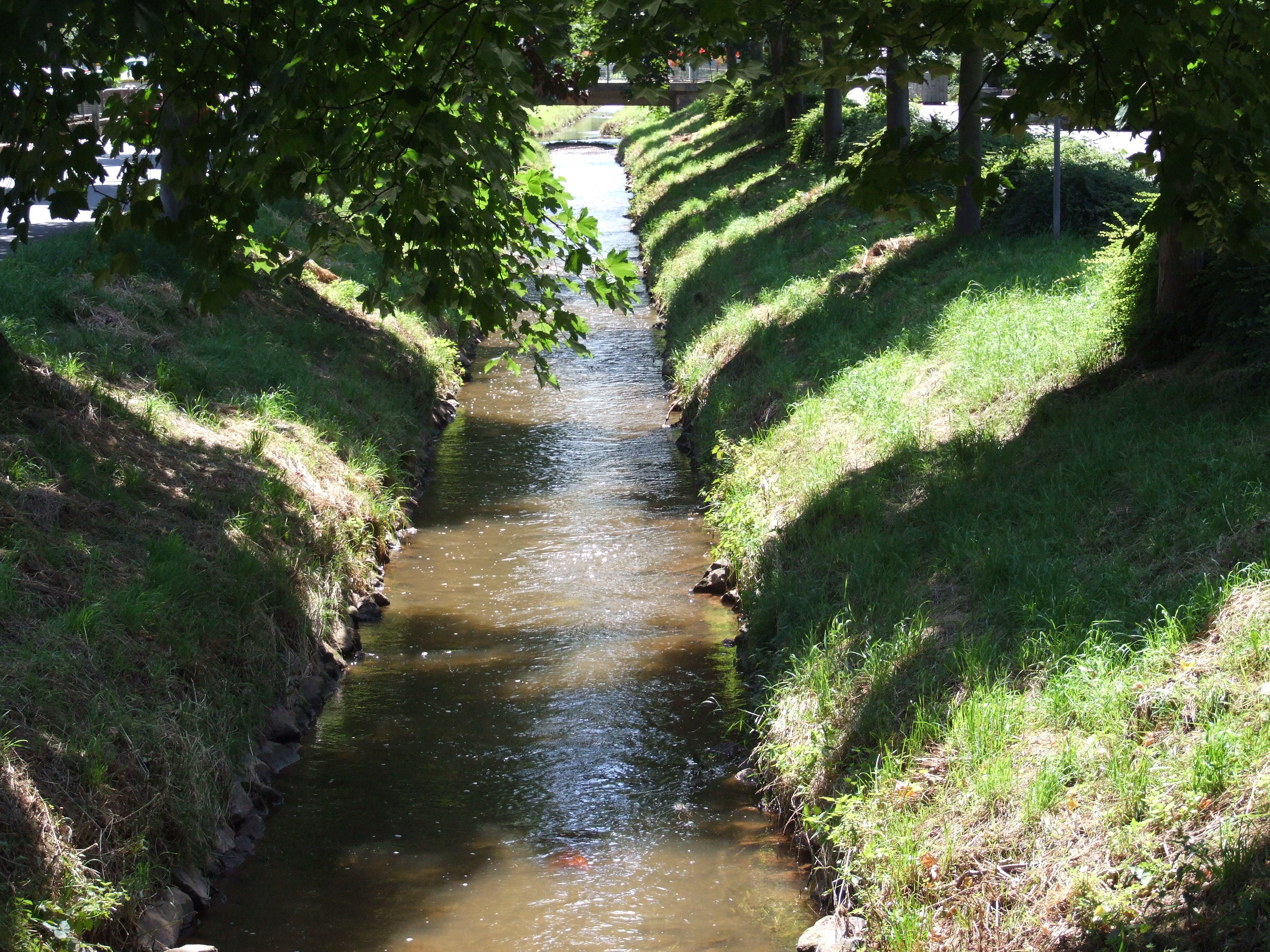

Location
- Country: Germany
- State: North Rhine-Westphalia

Physical characteristics
- Mouth
  - location: Erft
  - coordinates: 50.8266°N 6.7790°E
- Length: 39.2 km (24.4 mi)
- Basin size: 236 km^{2} (91 sq mi)

Basin features
- Progression: Erft→ Rhine→ North Sea

Rotbach is a river of North Rhine-Westphalia, Germany. It is a left tributary of the Erft.

The source of the Rotbach is located 1 km north of main town Kall nearly at the town border to Mechernich. The course reaches the town areas of Zülpich and Erftstadt.

Within the town area of Zülpich, the Vlattener Bach tributes into the Rotbach.

== See also ==
- List of rivers of North Rhine-Westphalia
