= Erft =

River in Germany

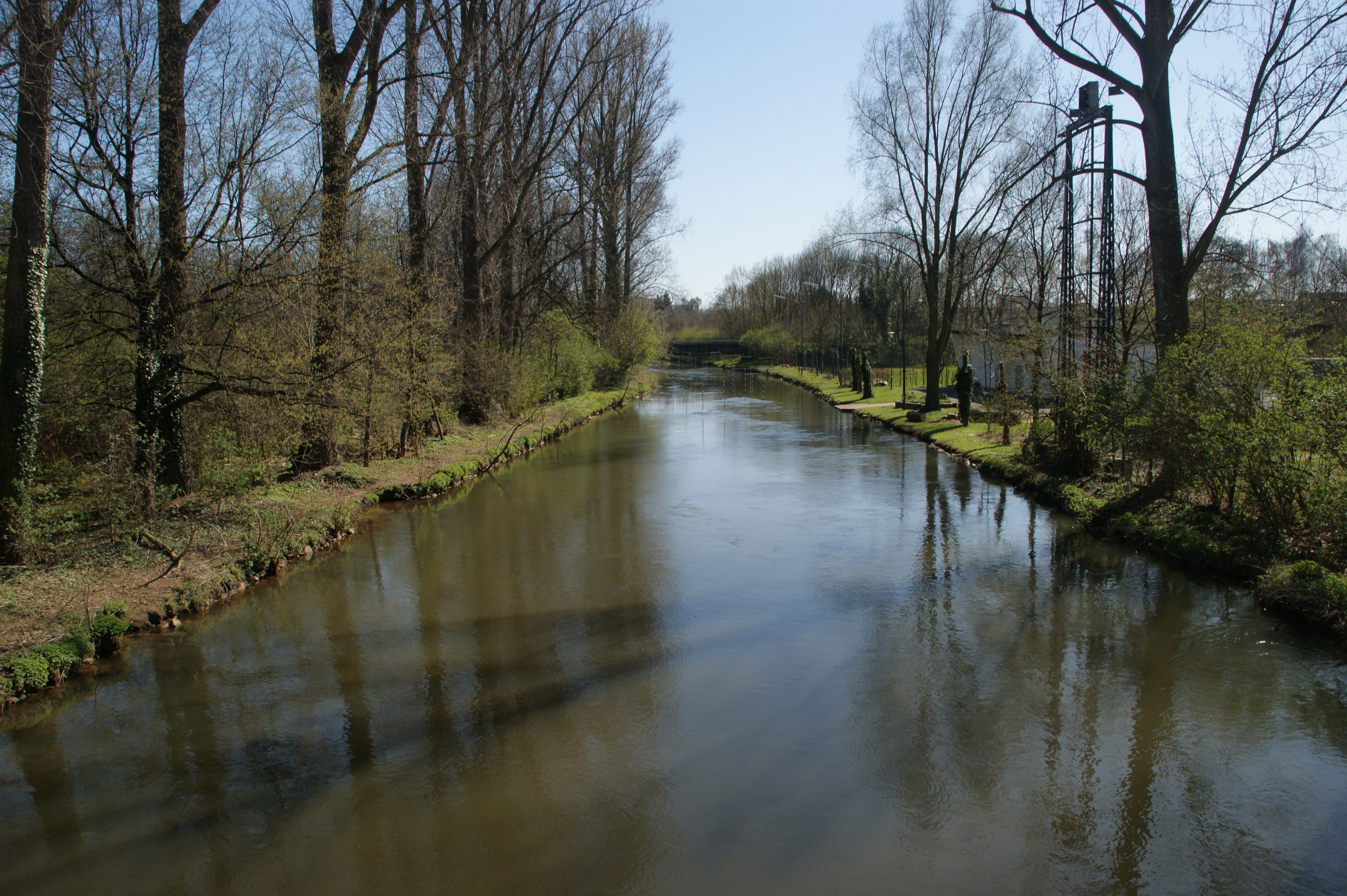
- Lower reaches of the Erft near Bergheim

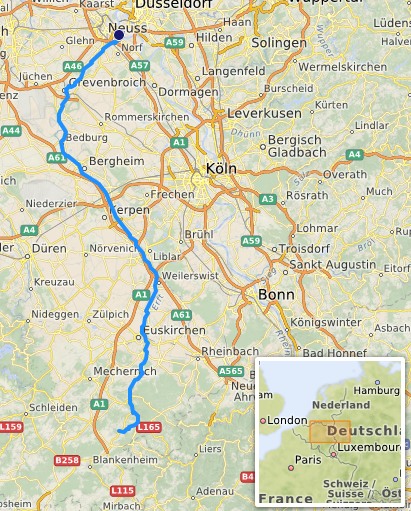
- Cours of the river Erft

Location
- Country: Germany
- State: North Rhine-Westphalia
- Reference no.: DE: 274

Physical characteristics
- Source
  - location: Southeast of Engelgau as the Kuhbach; Signed source of the Erft near Holzmülheim
  - coordinates: 50°29′14″N 6°35′14″E
  - elevation: 527 m above sea level (NHN)
- Mouth
  - location: Rhine near Neuss-Grimlinghausen
  - coordinates: 51°11′04″N 6°43′54″E
  - elevation: 31 m above sea level (NHN)
- Length: 106.6 km (66.2 mi) (incl. Kuhbach)
- Basin size: 1,837.915 km^{2} (709.623 sq mi)
- Discharge
  - location: at Neubrück gauge
  - average: 16.4 m^{3}/s (580 cu ft/s)
  - minimum: Record low: 5.15 m^{3}/s (182 cu ft/s) (in 16.07.2007); Average low: 10.4 m^{3}/s (370 cu ft/s)
  - maximum: Average high: 31.3 m^{3}/s (1,110 cu ft/s); Record high: 46.6 m^{3}/s (1,650 cu ft/s) (in 04.06.1984)

Basin features
- Progression: Rhine→ North Sea
- Landmarks: Cities: Neuss; Large towns: Euskirchen, Erftstadt, Bedburg, Bergheim, Grevenbroich, Kerpen; Small towns: Bad Münstereifel
- Tributaries
  - left: Veybach, Rotbach, Neffelbach
  - right: Swist, Gillbach, Norfbach

The Erft (pronounced [ɛʁft]) is a river in North Rhine-Westphalia, Germany. It flows through the foothills of the Eifel, and joins the Lower Rhine (left tributary). Its origin is near Nettersheim, and its mouth in Neuss-Grimlinghausen south of the Josef Cardinal Frings Bridge. The river is 106.6 kilometres (66.2 mi) long, which is significantly shorter than it was originally. Due to the open-pit mining of lignite in the Hambacher Loch, the flow of the river had to be changed.

The Erft gave its name to the town of Erftstadt, through which it flows, as well as to the Rhein-Erft district.

== River Course ==
The source is located within the town area of Nettersheim.

The river reaches then Bad Münstereifel, Euskirchen, Weilerswist, Erftstadt, Kerpen, Bergheim, Bedburg, Grevenbroich.

The river mouth to the Rhine ist located in Neuss, but the channel "Obererft (Upper Erft)" reaches the city border to Düsseldorf at Neuss Harbour.

Tributaries are (selected): Veybach, Swist, Rotbach, Neffelbach, Gillbach, Norfbach.

== Gallery ==
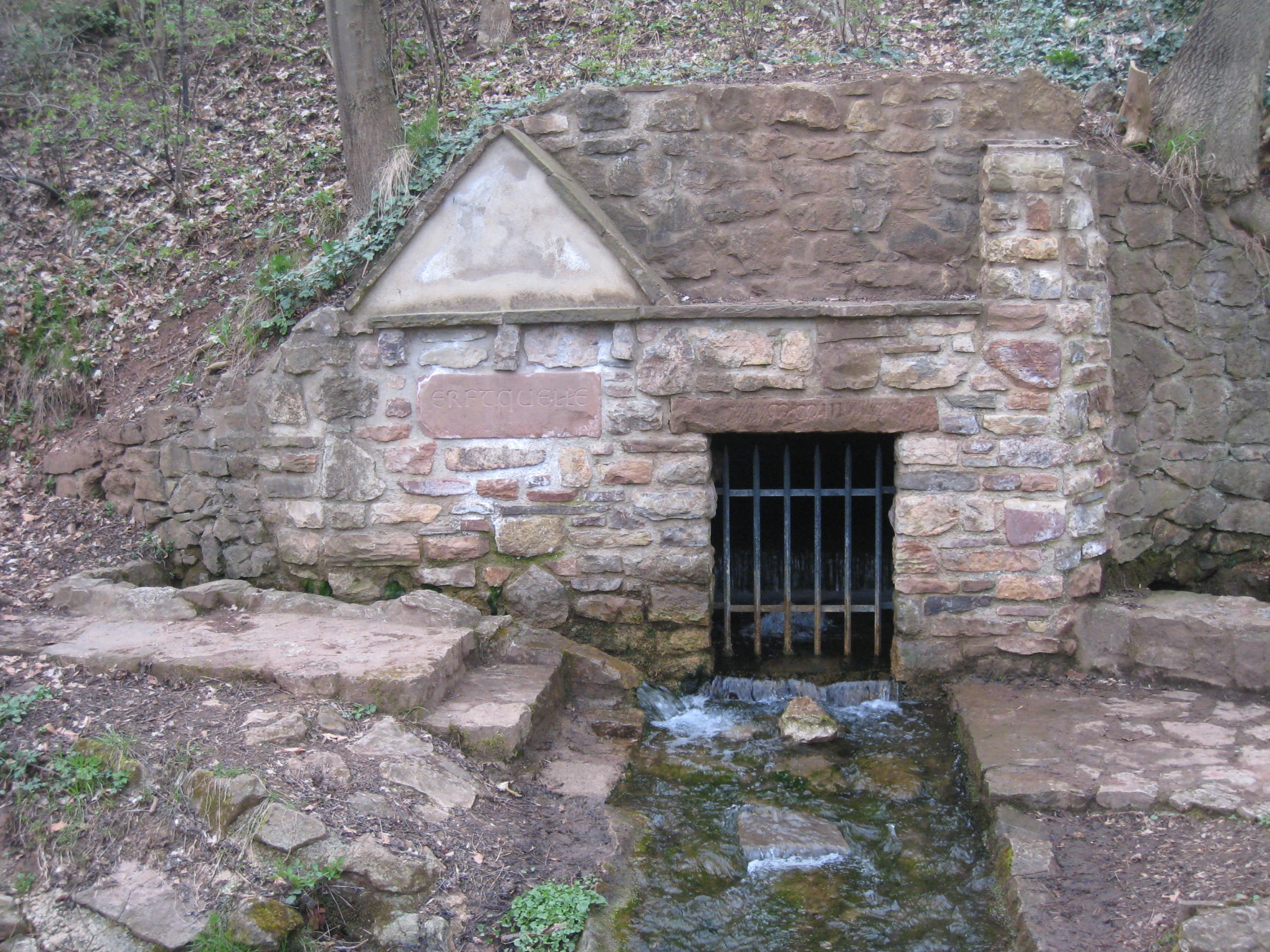
Source of the Erft near Holzmülheim

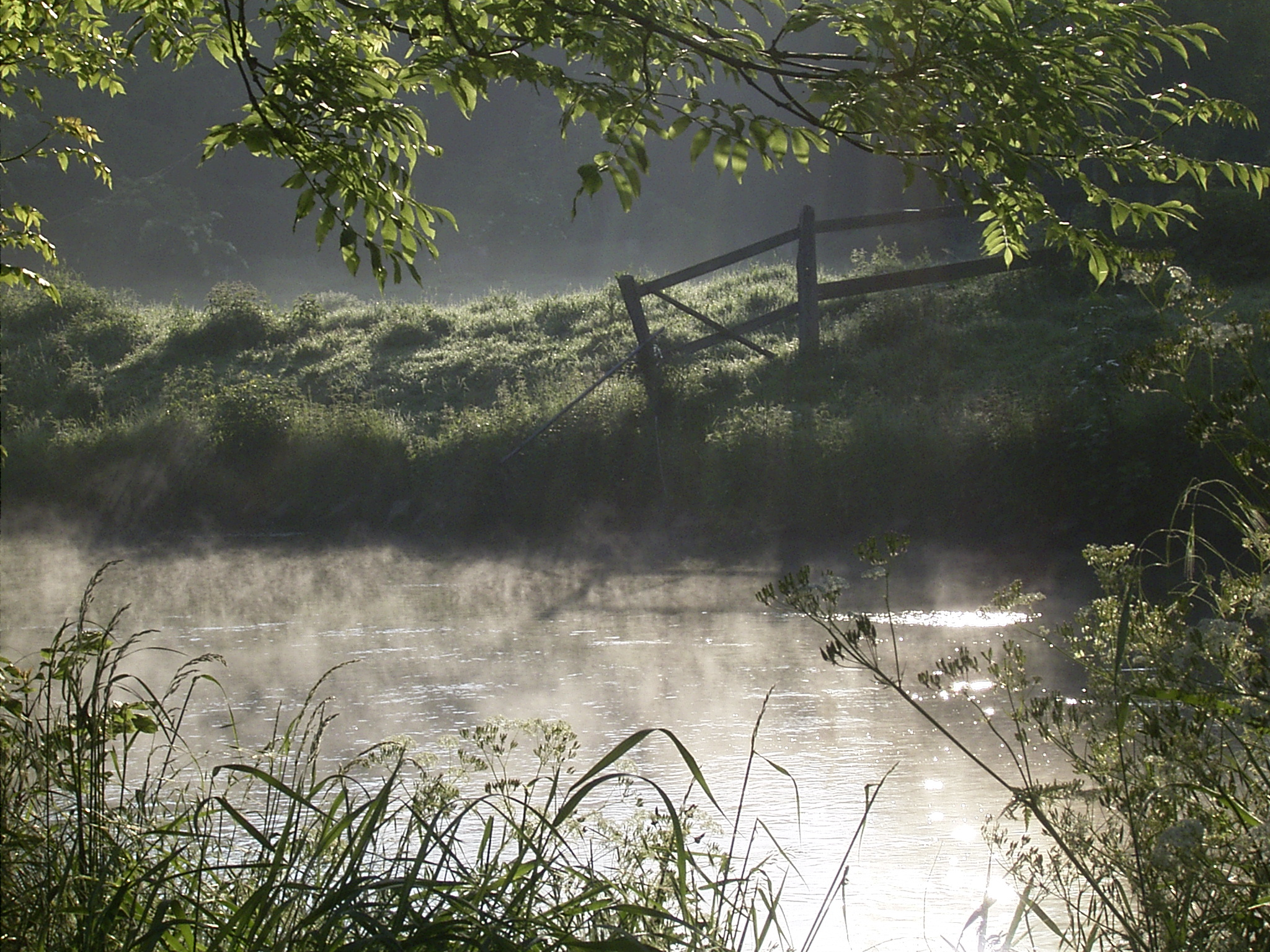
The Erft near Grevenbroich

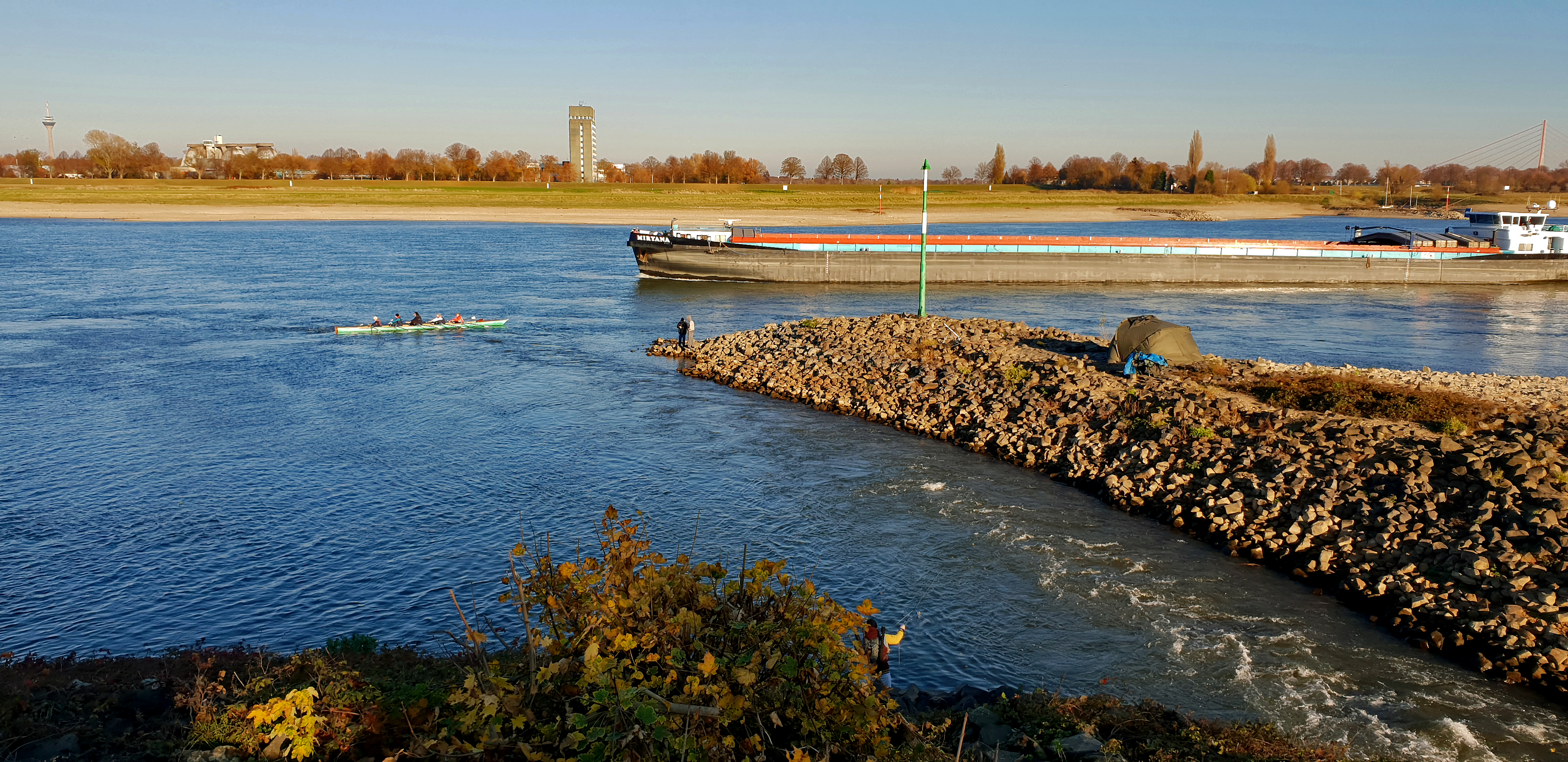
Mouth of the Erft in the Rhine near Neuss-Grimlinghausen
