= Verbrannter Berg =

Mountain in Germany

- Location within North Rhine-Westphalia

Highest point
- Elevation: 516.2 m above sea level (NHN) (1,694 ft)
- Coordinates: 50°36′45.9″N 6°26′42.2″E

Geography
- Location: near Wolfgarten; Euskirchen, North Rhine-Westphalia, Germany
- Parent range: Kermeter, North Eifel

The Verbrannter Berg ("Burnt Mountain") near Wolfgarten in the county of Euskirchen in the German state of North Rhine-Westphalia is a hill, 516.2 m above sea level (NHN), in the Kermeter, a ridge in the Eifel mountains, in the region of Rur Eifel; at the same time Verbrannter Berg is the name of a parcel of land.

== Origin of the name ==
The origin of the name is not clear. One possible explanation is the former presence of numerous charcoal piles on the Kermeter in the past.

== Location ==
The Verbrannter Berg rises in the Eifel National Park on the Kermeter ridge above the valleys of the Rur to the north and the Urft to the south. Its summit lies about 260 metres south of the Landesstraße 15 or Kermeter High Road (Kermeterhochstraße), which runs from the Rur Dam southeastwards over the ridge to the L 249; the latter then runs to the nearby Schleiden village of Wolfgarten.

== Flora ==
The area around of the Verbrannter Berg forms one of the largest contiguous forests in the state.

== Map ==
National Park map, walking map no. 50 published by the Eifel Club, North Rhine-Westphalia State Survey Office, 1:25,000, 2008
