= Wildbretshügel =

- Location within North Rhine-Westphalia

Highest point
- Elevation: 525.3 m above sea level (NHN) (1,723 ft)
- Coordinates: 50°36′58.4″N 6°25′15″E

Geography
- Location: Near Gemünd and Hasenfeld; Euskirchen, Düren; North Rhine-Westphalia, Germany
- Parent range: Kermeter, North Eifel

The Wildbretshügel (Venison Hill), at 525.3 m above sea level (NHN), is the third highest hill in the Kermeter, an upland region which is part of the Northern Eifel. It is located near Gemünd and Hasenfeld in the counties of Euskirchen and Düren in the German state of North Rhine-Westphalia.

== Location ==
Within the Rur Eifel, which is part of the Northern Eifel, the Wildbretshügel rises between the Rur and Urft Reservoirs in the Eifel National Park. Its summit is located in the extreme north of the borough of Schleiden on the territory of Gemünd, a large part of it belonging to the borough of Heimbach and parish of Hasenfeld. The Wildbretshügel summit is located about 1 km west of the carpark "Wilder Kermeter".

== Leisure ==
Numerous hiking and cycling trails make the Wildbretshügel a popular destination for excursions. The view of the Rur Reservoir and its surrounding woods is appreciated by the visitors. Since the establishment of the Eifel National Park, several hiking trails on the Wildbretshügel have been closed to create quiet zones for animals and plants.
