= Obersee (Rur) =

Lake in North-Rhine Westphalia, Germany

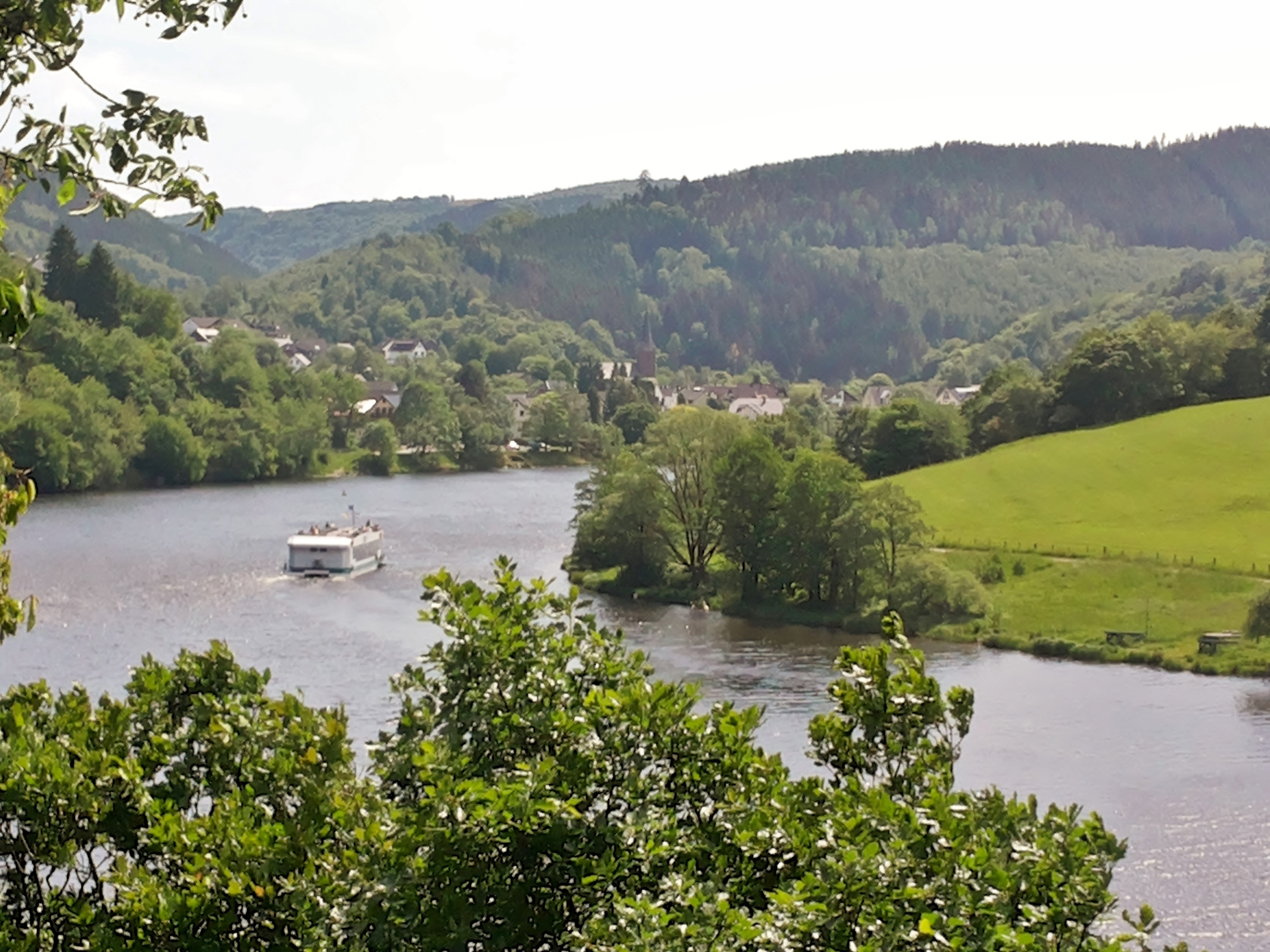
- The Obersee between Einruhr and Rurberg
- Interactive map of Obersee
- Location: Borough of Aachen, North Rhine-Westphalia (Germany)
- Coordinates: 50.600°N 6.389°E
- Construction began: ?–1959

Dam and spillways
- Impounds: Rur, Urft
- Height (foundation): 33 m
- Height (thalweg): 27 m
- Length: 280 m
- Elevation at crest: 283 m above sea level (NN)
- Width (crest): 14.0 m
- Width (base): 135 m
- Dam volume: 320,000 m^{3}

Reservoir
- Total capacity: 23 M m^{3}
- Active capacity: 17.9 or 20.8 M m^{3}
- Maximum length: – 4.8 Rur river km (nur Obersee) – 5.15 Rur river km (Obersee and pre-dam) – 13.4 km (to the head of the reservoir)
- Normal elevation: 279.6 m above sea level (NN)

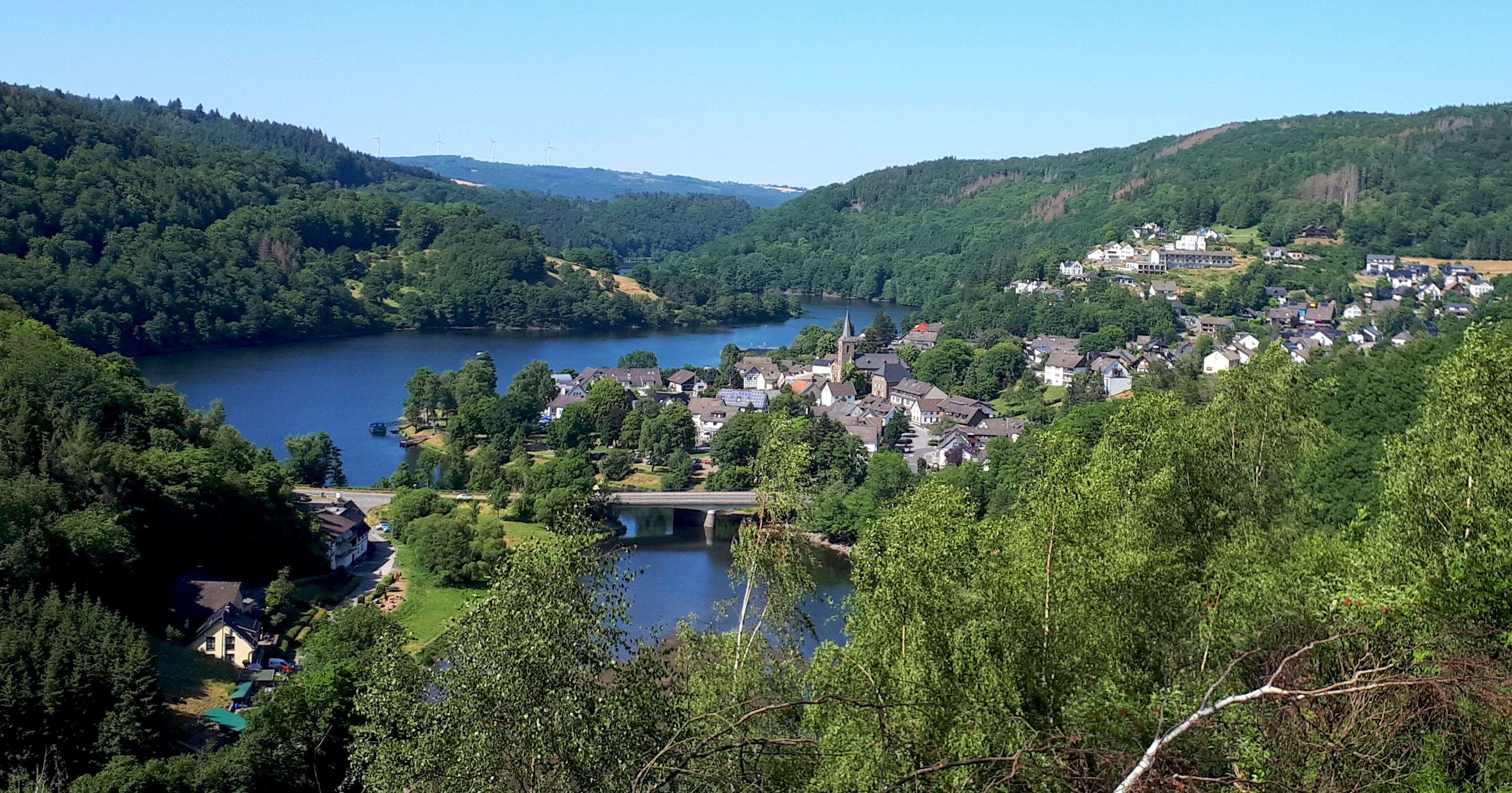
The Obersee and Einruhr

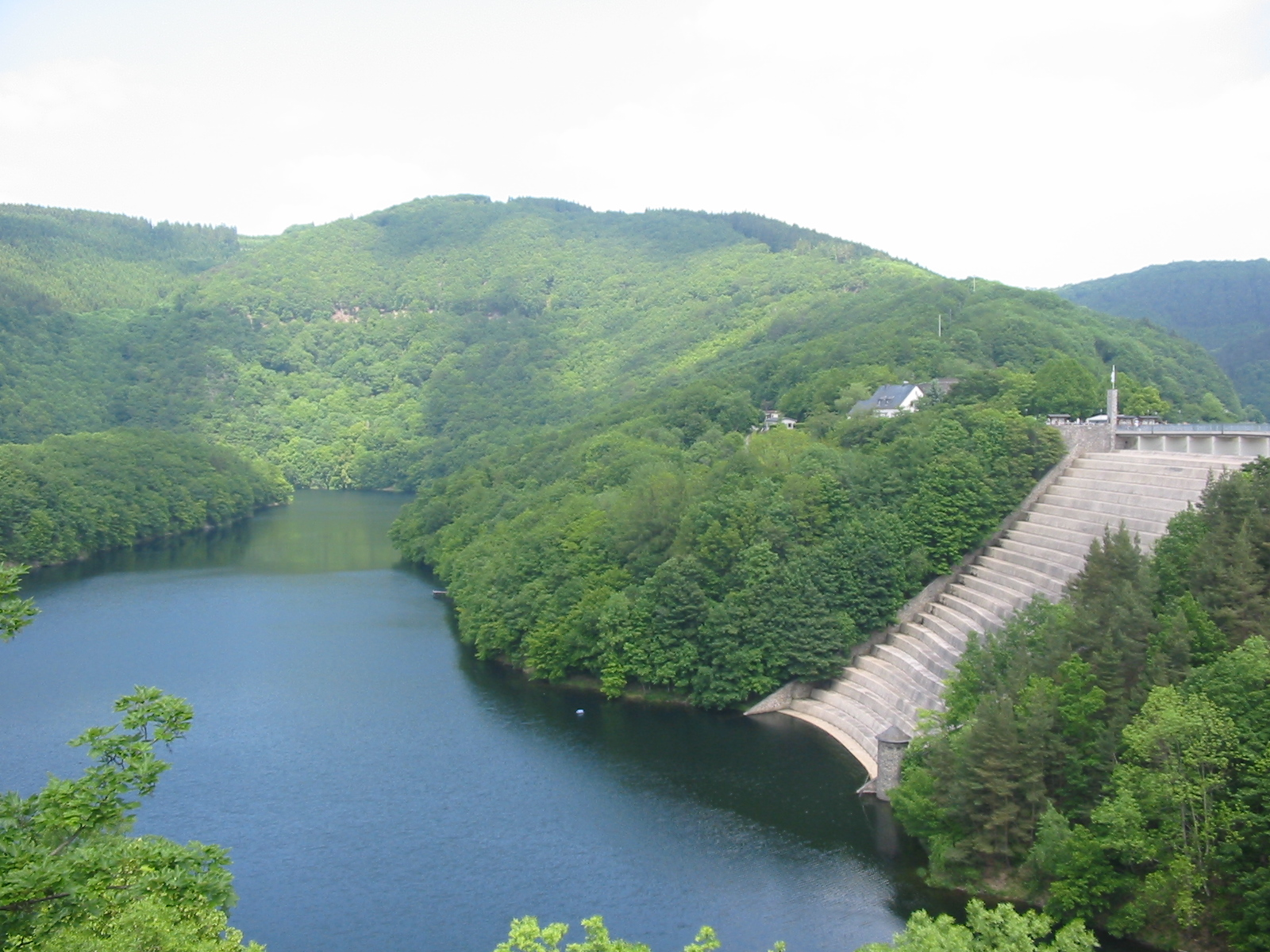
The Obersee and Urft Dam. Left: the Obersee (pre-dam of the Rur Dam); right: the overfilled dam foot with spillway of the Urft Reservoir

The Obersee (German pronunciation: [ˈoːbɐzeː], lit. 'Upper Lake') near Simmerath in the borough of Aachen is the main forebay of the Rur Reservoir on the River Rur in the Eifel mountains of Germany. Its barrier is the Paulushofdamm. The reservoir, like that of the Rur Dam, belongs to the Eifel-Rur Water Company (Wasserverband Eifel-Rur). The reservoir provides drinking water.

== Location ==
The dam system, which comprises the Paulushofdamm and Obersee, lies in the Rur Eifel, a part of the North Eifel, southwest of the Kermeter, north of the Dreiborn Plateau and east of the Monschau Hedge Land near Simmerath (borough of Aachen). It is located immediately below the Urft Dam, which impounds the waters of the Urft that flow from the east to create the Urft Reservoir, and immediately above the Rur Dam which impounds the waters of the Rur to form the Rur Reservoir. While the dam belongs to the High Fens-Eifel Nature Park, the large eastern arm of the Obersee in the north lies within the Eifel National Park.

== Photos ==
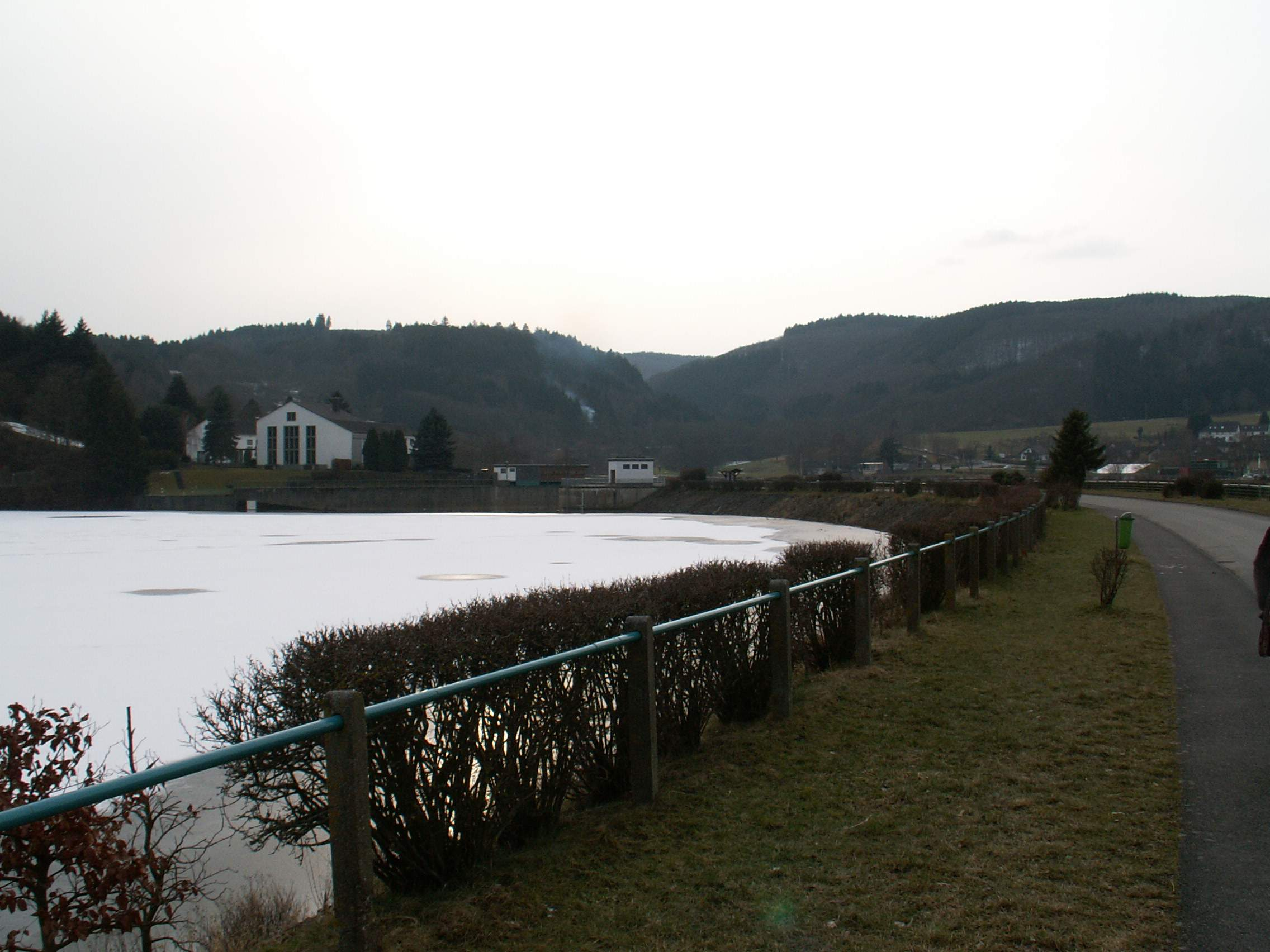
The Paulushofdamm.
Behind: the pumpwork and broad-crested weir

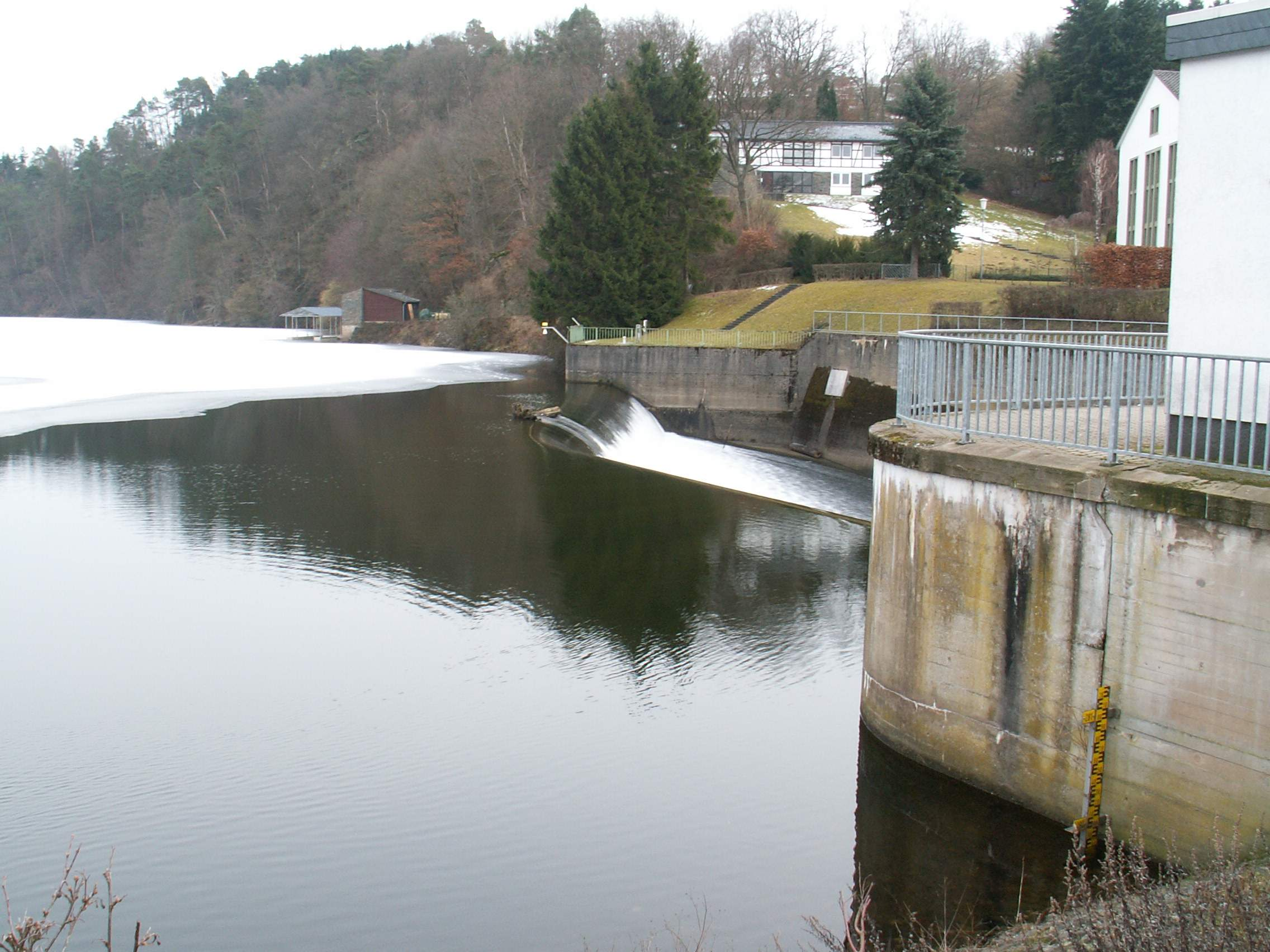
The weir and pumpwork on the Paulushofdamm

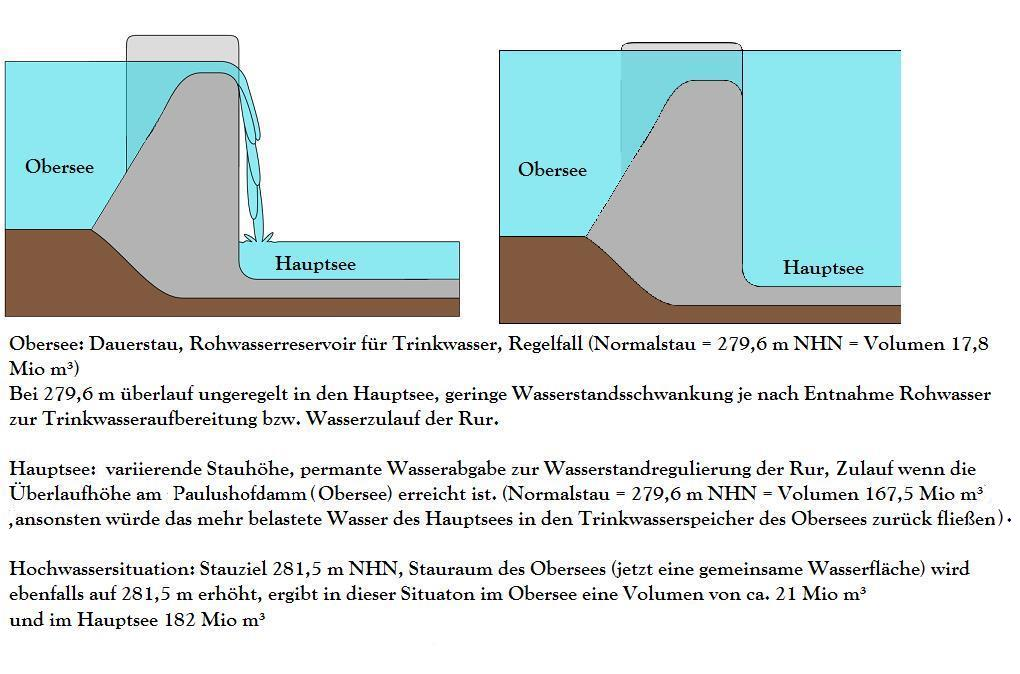
Diagram of the function of the weir in the Paulushofdamm

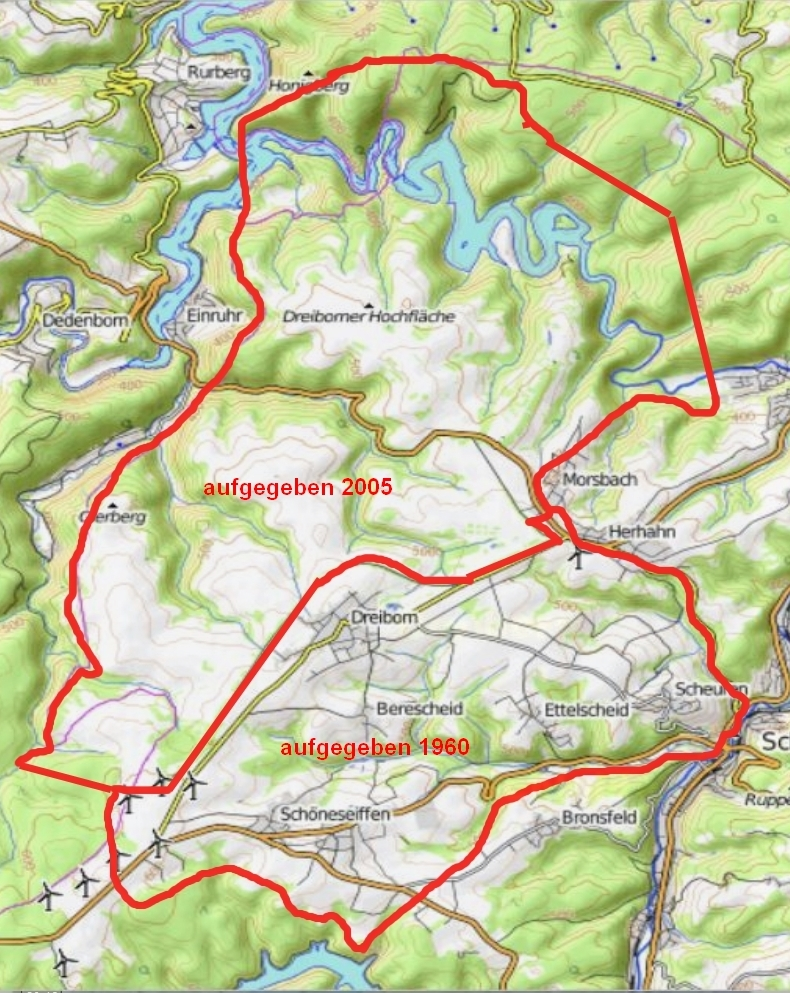
The Obersee. its eastern arm was, like that of the Urft Reservoir, part of the former military training area at Vogelsang.

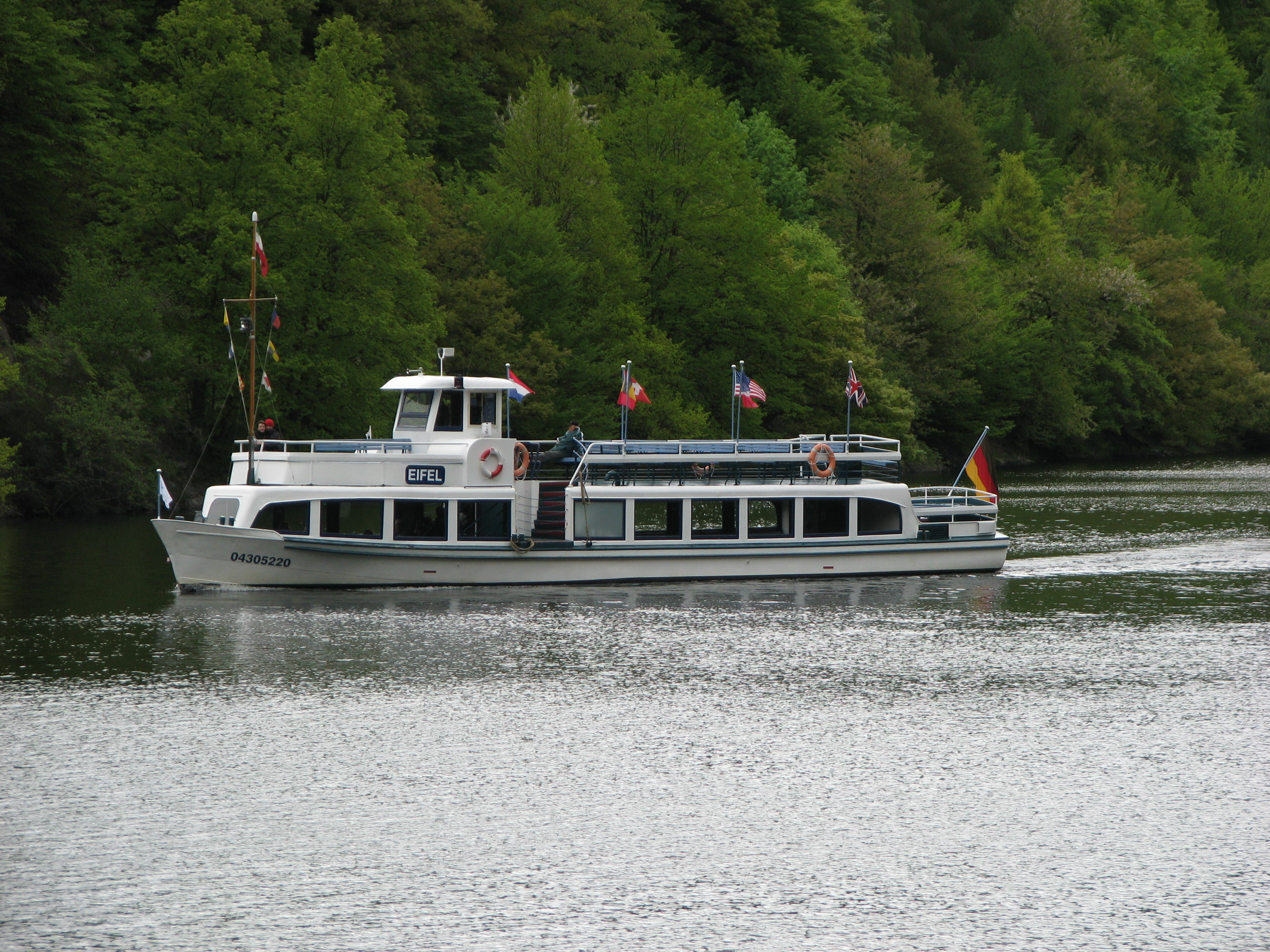
The passenger boat, Eifel, on the Obersee

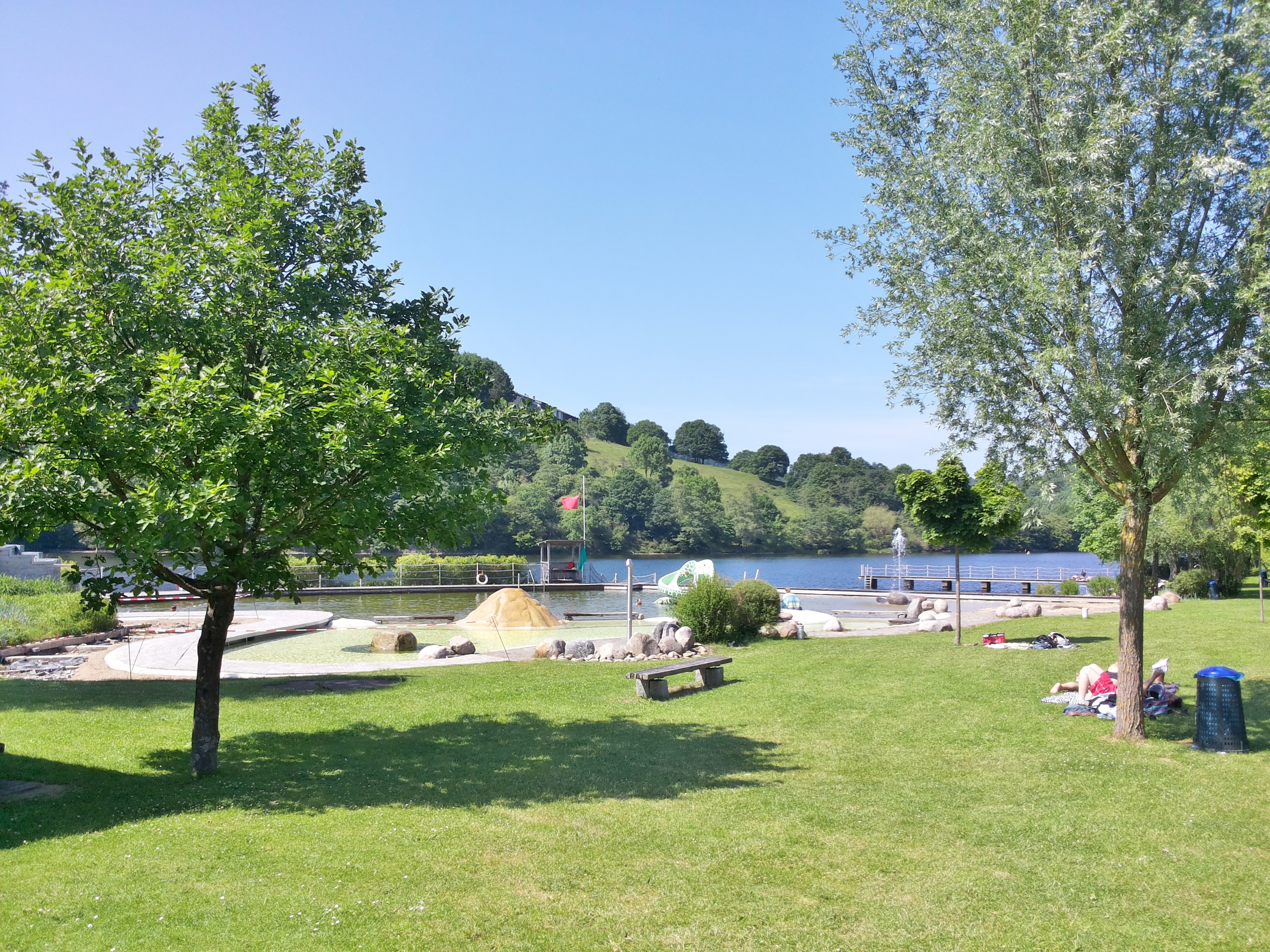
The swimming area, Naturerlebnisbad Einruhr, on the Obersee

== See also ==
- List of dams in Germany
