= Kermeter =

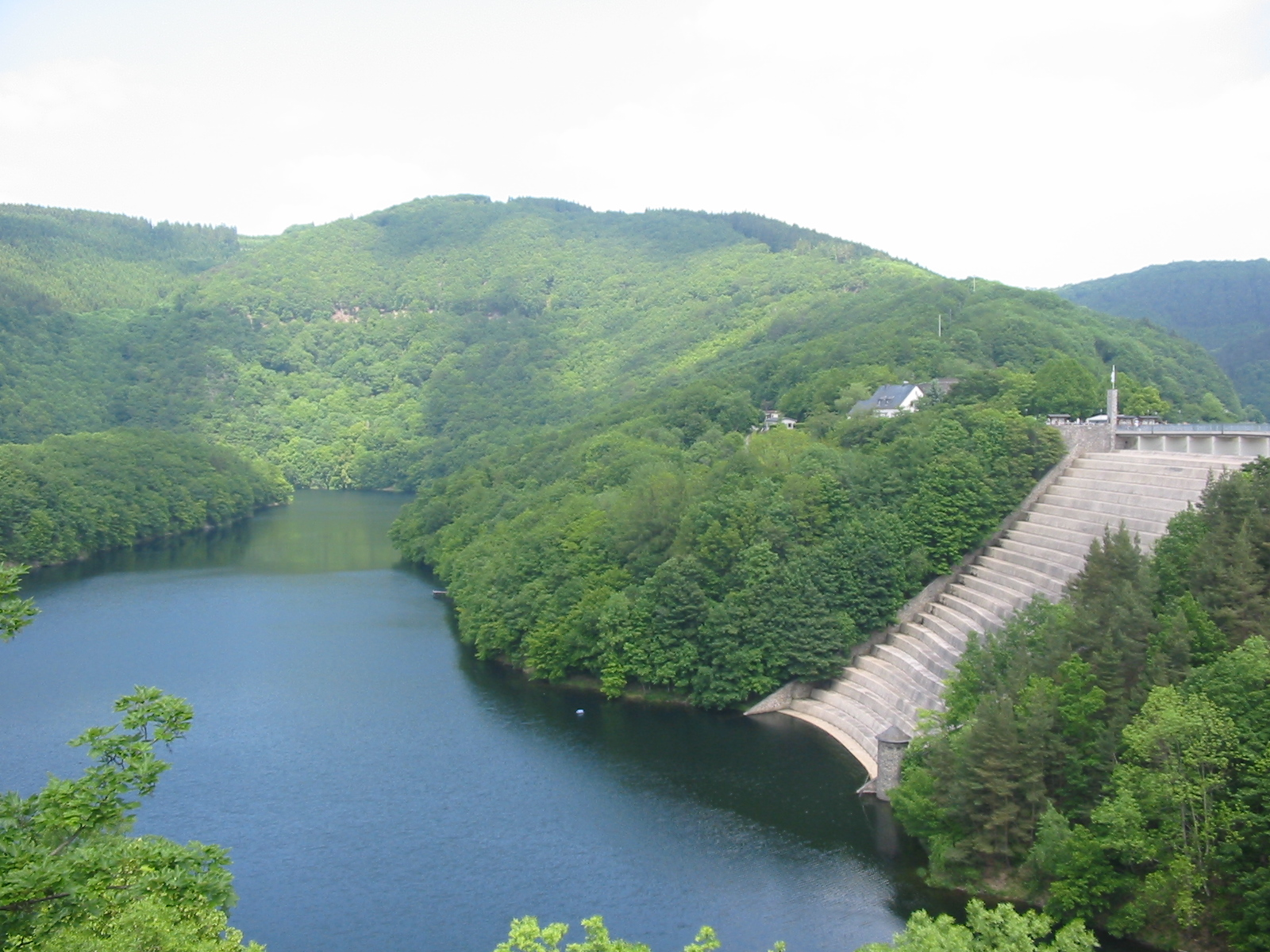
The Kermeter: in the foreground the Obersee (Pre-basin of the Rur Dam) and the wall of the Urft Dam

The Kermeter is an upland region, up to 527.8 m above sea level (NN), which is part of the Rureifel within the North Eifel in the districts of Aachen, Düren and Euskirchen in the southwestern part of the state of North Rhine-Westphalia in Germany.

The Kermeter ridge is covered by a forest, some 33 km² in area, that is one of the largest contiguous, deciduous forests in the Rhineland. Since 1 January 2004 it has formed the core zone of the Eifel National Park.

== Location ==
The Kermeter lies on the territory of the three Eifel parishes of Heimbach, Simmerath and Schleiden. It is bordered to the north and west by the Rur Reservoir (around 281.5 m above NN) and thus by the Rur valley near Heimbach, to the southwest by the Obersee (a pre-basin of the Rur Dam), and in the south by the Urft Reservoir (at around 322.5 m above NN) and thus the Urft valley. In the southwest the Kermeter transitions into Wolfgarten and Gemünd in the direction of the upper reaches of the Rotbach.

The highest point in the Kermeter is an unnamed rounded summit (527.8 m above NN) near Wolfgarten, on which the fire service and observation tower, the Wolfgarten Fire Watchtower (Feuerwachtturm Wolfgarten), stands (a list of other Kermeter hills is given below).

== Landscape and nature ==
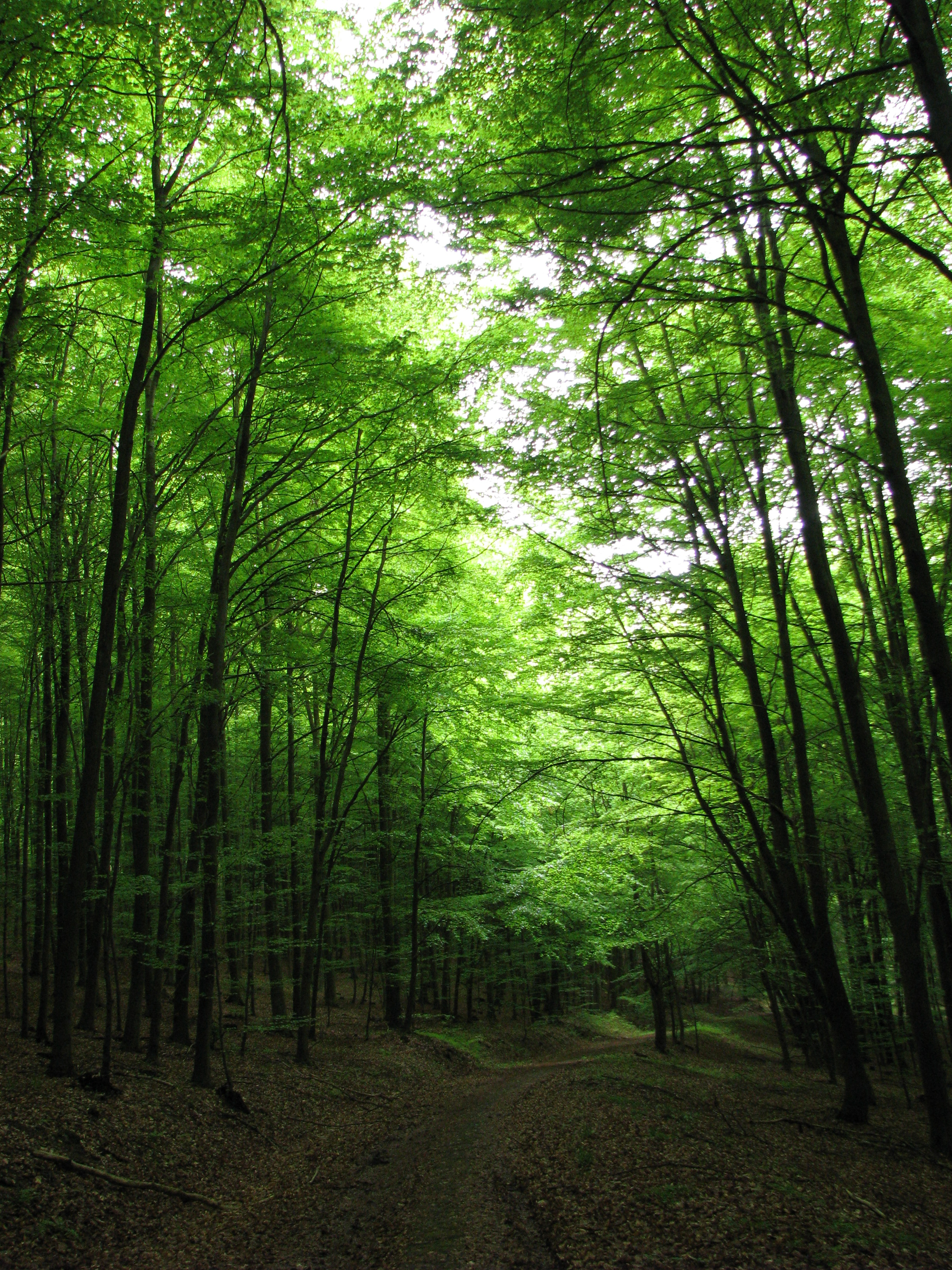
Trail through the beech forest

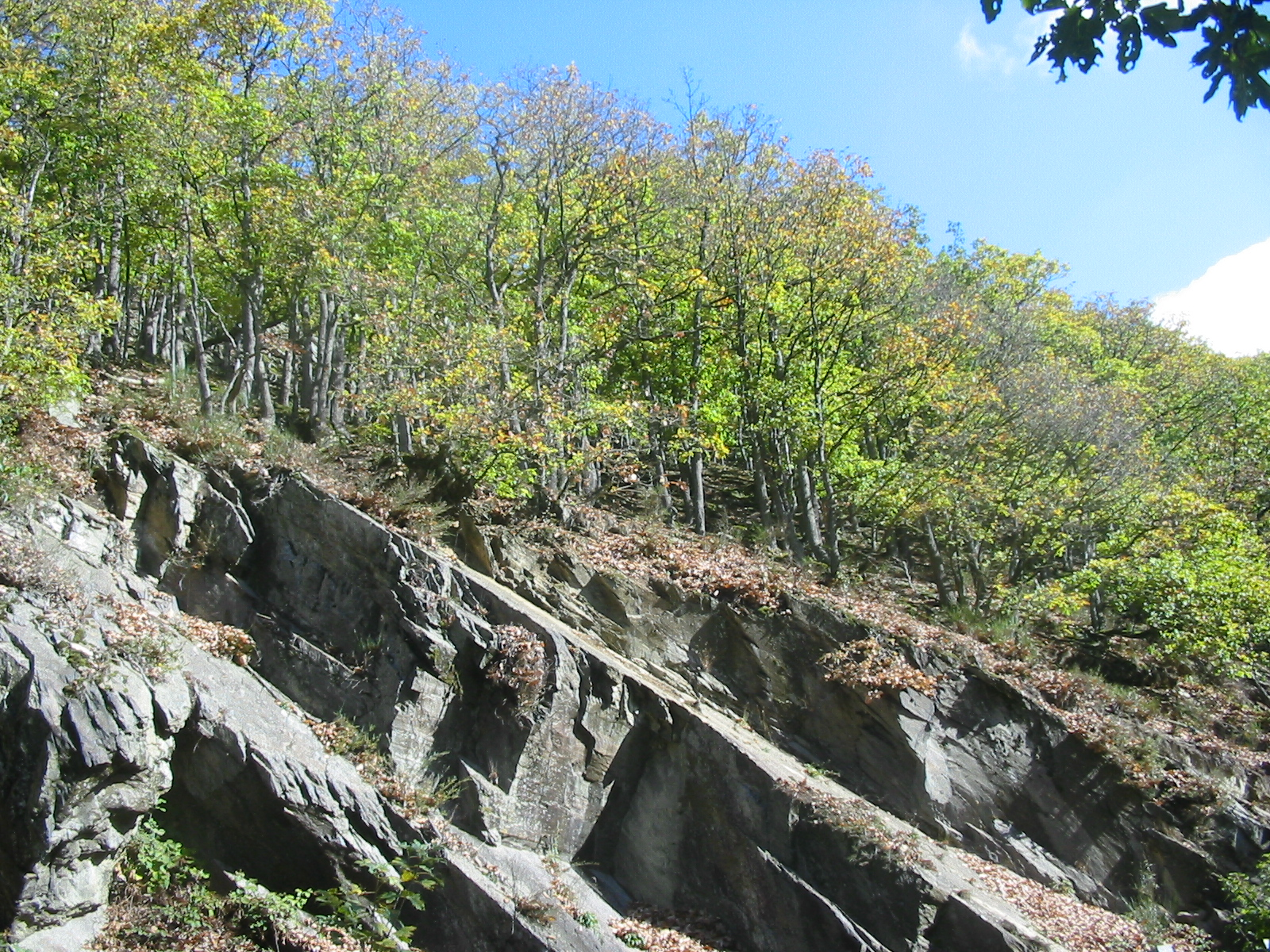
Southern hillside of the Kermeter with oak woods and slate crags

The Kermeter covers an area of 3,592 hectares, of which about 3,300 hectares is a single forested area (the so-called Kermeter-Hochwald or Kermeter High Forest). Beech woods dominate the shaded, damp northern slopes (24%), in places with trees that are over 200 years old. Oak woods hold sway on the drier, southern slopes (26%), interrupted by rocky outcrops (Felsheide). At the start of the 21st century almost half the forest area still consisted of spruce trees, a consequence of reforestation measures after the Second World War. However it is planned that in the long term the spruce stock will be reduced in favour of deciduous woods.

The forestry administration has established barrier-free panoramic trails at the "Wilder Kermeter" information point. Further circular hikes and long-distance hikes are also possible from there, as the information point is also served by public transport.

== Hills ==
Amongst the hills and high points of the Kermeter are the following, according to the Deutsche Grundkarte and sorted by height in metres above sea level:

- Unnamed summit near Wolfgarten (527.8 m), Euskirchen district; highest hill in the Kermeter; with an observation tower and the Wolfgarten Fire Watchtower (Feuerwachtturm Wolfgarten)
- Hellberg (525.8 m)
- Wildbretshügel (525.3 m), Euskirchen district; good views of the Rur Reservoir
- Theissenberg (522.4 m), Euskirchen district
- Verbrannter Berg (515.5 m); with the Verbrannter Berg ancient forest (Urwald Verbrannter Berg)
- Winterberg (Wolfgarten) (503.4 m); with Kermeterstollen below its western hillside
- Mauelter Berg (502.4 m); with fire watchtower (incl. transmitter) and hunting lodge
- Honigberg (495 m), Kreis Düren district
- Schweizer Berge, slate formation on the southern outskirts of the Urftsee lake (max. 482.2 m)
- Böttenbachsberg (466.6 m)
- Weidenauer Berg (453.3 m), Kreis Düren district
- Adamsberg (443.8 m)
- Altenberg (423.0 m); near Mariawald Abbey
- Griesberg (421.3 m); near Mariawald Abbey
- Winterberg (southern Kermeter) (404.8 m)
- Hohenberg (363.7 m)
- Tonsberg (333.3 m); with ruined castle (cultural monument)
