= Urft Dam =

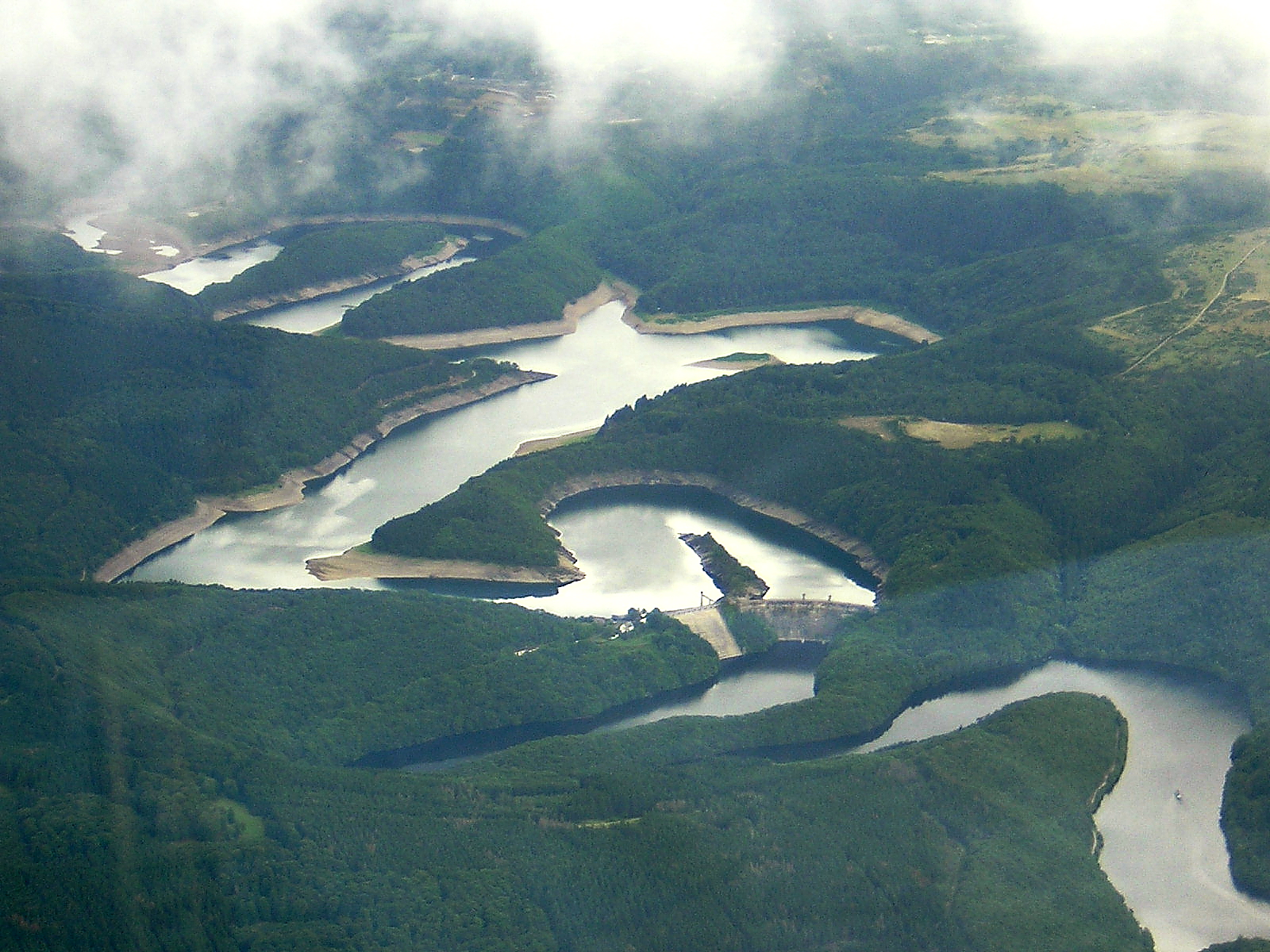
- Aerial photograph of the Urft Dam and Reservoir; in the foreground is the Obersee lake
- Interactive map of Urft Dam
- Location: Kreis Euskirchen
- Coordinates: 50.60222°N 6.41889°E
- Construction began: 1900 - 1905

Dam and spillways
- Type of dam: Gravity dam
- Impounds: Urft
- Height (foundation): 58.5
- Height (thalweg): 55
- Length: 226
- Elevation at crest: 324
- Width (crest): 6
- Width (base): 50.5
- Dam volume: 135000

Reservoir
- Total capacity: 47.75 million m^{3}
- Active capacity: 45.51 million m^{3}
- Catchment area: 326.5 km^{2}
- Surface area: 2.16 km^{2}
- Maximum length: 12 km
- Normal elevation: 322.5 m

Power Station
- Operator: Wasserverband Eifel-Rur
- Installed capacity: 16 MW

The Urft Dam (German: Urfttalsperre) is a 58.50 metre high dam in the southwestern part of the state of North Rhine-Westphalia in Germany. It was built in 1905. The dam impounds the River Urft in the district of Euskirchen to create the Urft Reservoir (Urftstausee), 2.16 km^{2} in area. The reservoir is also called the Urftsee (Lake Urft).

The Urft Dam, which was constructed during the period 1900 to 1905, and the Urft Reservoir, which was then the biggest reservoir in Europe, having belonged since 1993 to the Eifel-Rur Water Board (Wasserverband Eifel-Rur).

== Location ==
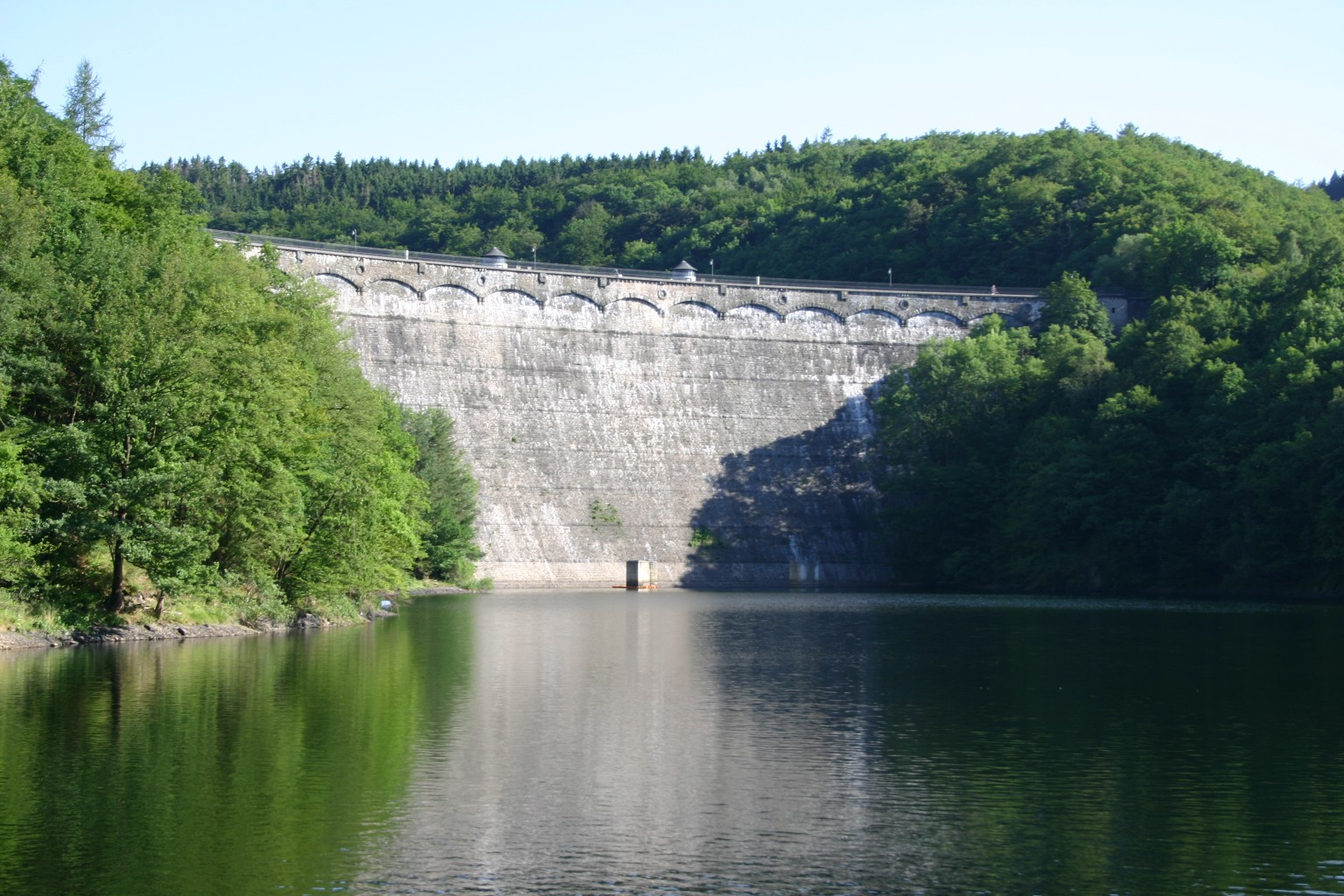
Downstream side of the Urft Dam with the Obersee in the foreground

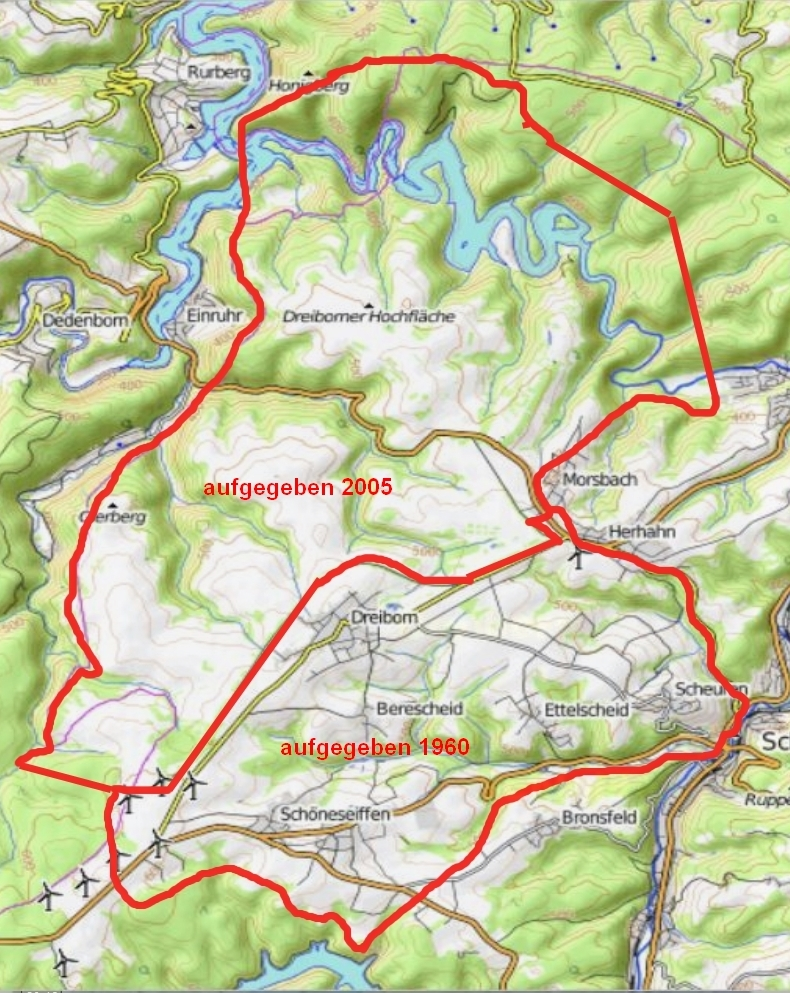
Vogelsang Military Training Area

The Urft barrier system that comprises the Urft Dam and Urft Reservoir is located in the Rur Eifel, a subdivision of the North Eifel region, south of the Kermeter ridge, north-northeast of the Dreiborn Plateau between Simmerath-Rurberg (in the neighbouring region of Aachen) to the west-northwest and Schleiden-Gemünd (Euskirchen district) to the east-southeast. It lies immediately above the Obersee, the main pre-basin (Vorbecken) of the Rur Reservoir, in which the waters of the Urft and Rur are impounded, and is situated within the Eifel National Park, founded in 2004, which is in turn surrounded by the Hohes Venn-Eifel Nature Park.

== Dam wall ==
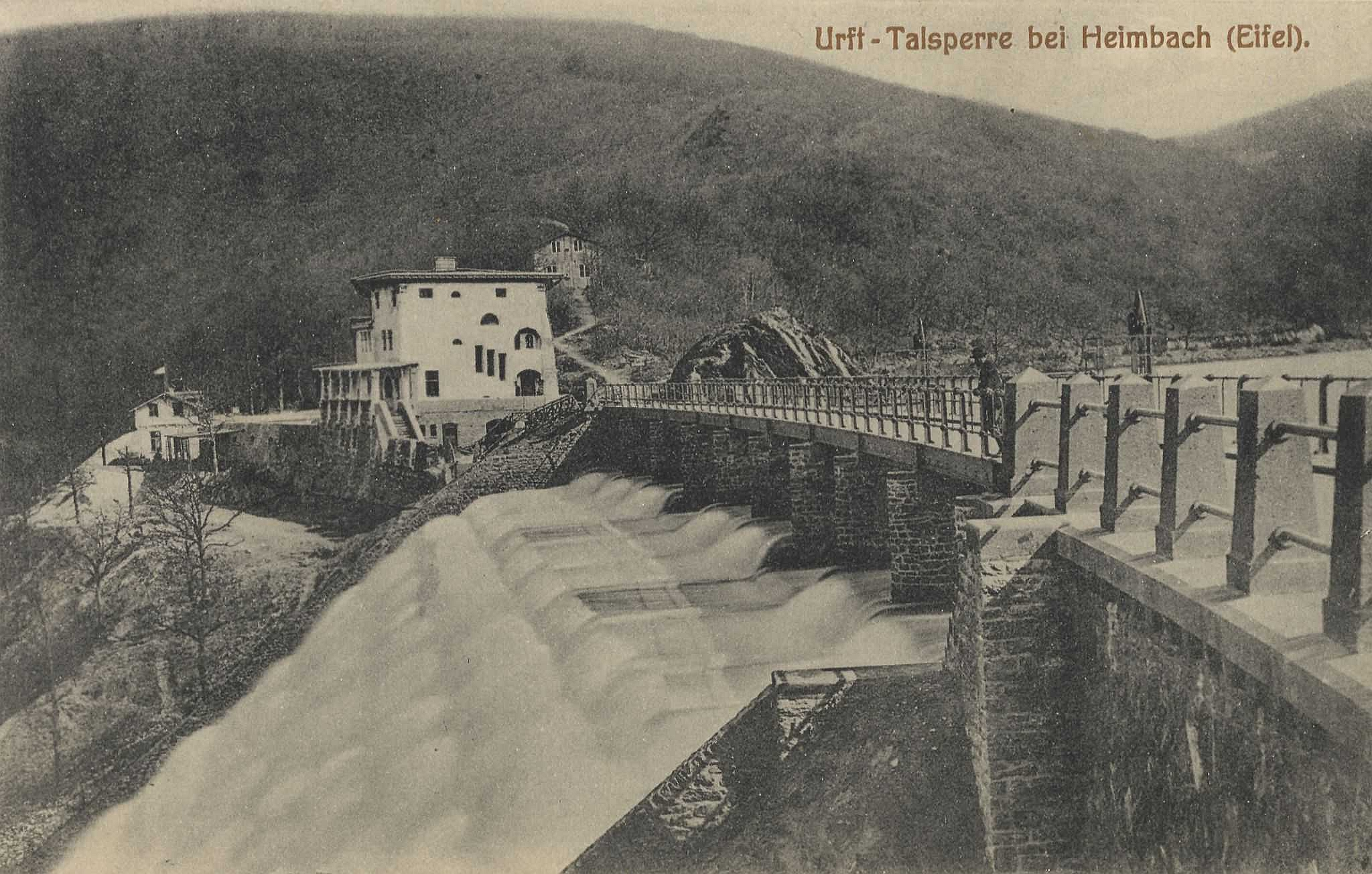
The Urft Dam in 1911

The Urft dam is a curved gravity dam with its convex side facing upstream and an earth embankment (an Intze Wedge) on the reservoir side that reaches to about half the height of the dam wall. It is situated around 6.8 kilometres, as the crow flies, west-northwest of Gemünd, the northern part of the town of Schleiden in Euskirchen district.

The Urft Dam was built between 1900 and 1905. The overall plan for the dam was developed by Prof. Dr. Otto Intze from Aachen and built according to the so-called Intze Principle; Intze also led the construction. To build the dam wall a railway line was laid from Gemünd to the site to transport men and materiel. The barrage is made of rubble stone composed of greywacke and slate that was quarried locally and rises 58.5 metres above its base (Gründungssohle). At its crown, it is around 226 metres long and 6 metres wide, and is 50.5 metres wide at its foot. The Urft Dam was also the highest in Europe until the construction of the Bober Dam in the Giant Mountains of Silesia in 1912.

On its completion, the Urft Dam became the model for many other projects at home and abroad after water management for industrialization became increasingly important after the end of the 19th century. The trial impoundment of the river began in November 1904, its use in water management started on 26 August 1905.

North of the Urft Dam and separated from it by the base of a narrow peninsula is the spillway in the shape of an overflow weir with a maximum width of 91 metres which cascades down a total of 33 steps. Within the dam at an interval of 2.5 metres are vertical clay-filled tubes that drain away the water that seeps into the dam wall.

Several bottom outlet towers provide access to inspection walkways at two different depths that enable the state of Urft Dam to be checked. The lower inspection gallery runs along its base joint. From 1994 to 2000 the barrage was thoroughly renovated. Among other things, a problem with the uplift pressure was resolved. It was also given two new inspection galleries that were driven using blasting techniques, which have a total length of 320 metres, are an average of 3.10 metres high and 2.40 metres wide, as well as new sealing and drainage and numerous measuring devices.

The Eifel-Rur Water Board celebrated the 100th anniversary of the opening of the Urft Dam on 26 August 2005.

Since the Rur Dam was completed, the Urft dam not only impounds water on its upstream side, but also impounds the waters of the Rur Reservoir (also called the Obersee) on its downstream side up to a depth of 12 metres.

== Reservoir ==
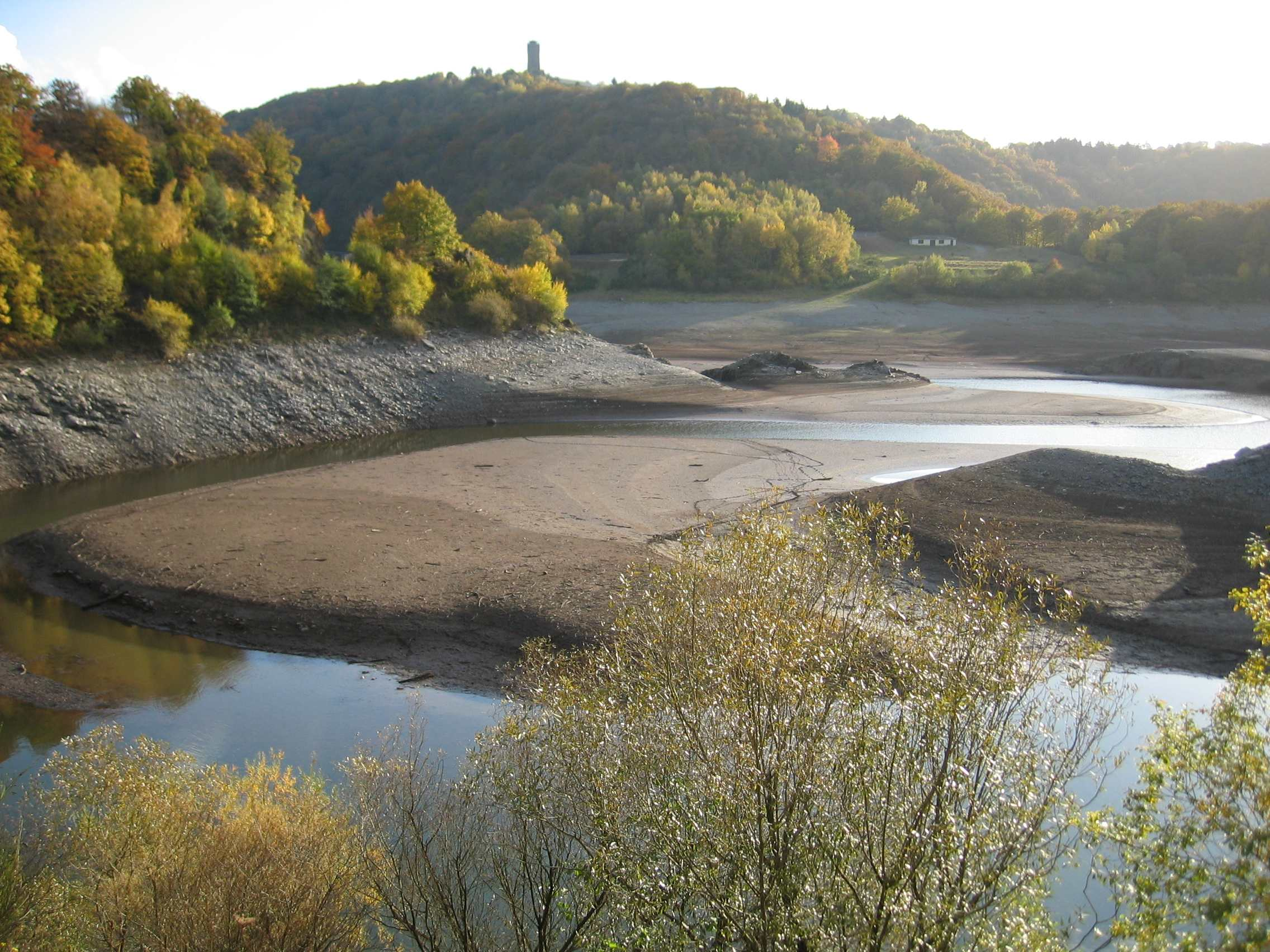
Urft Reservoir below the Nazi fort of Vogelsang

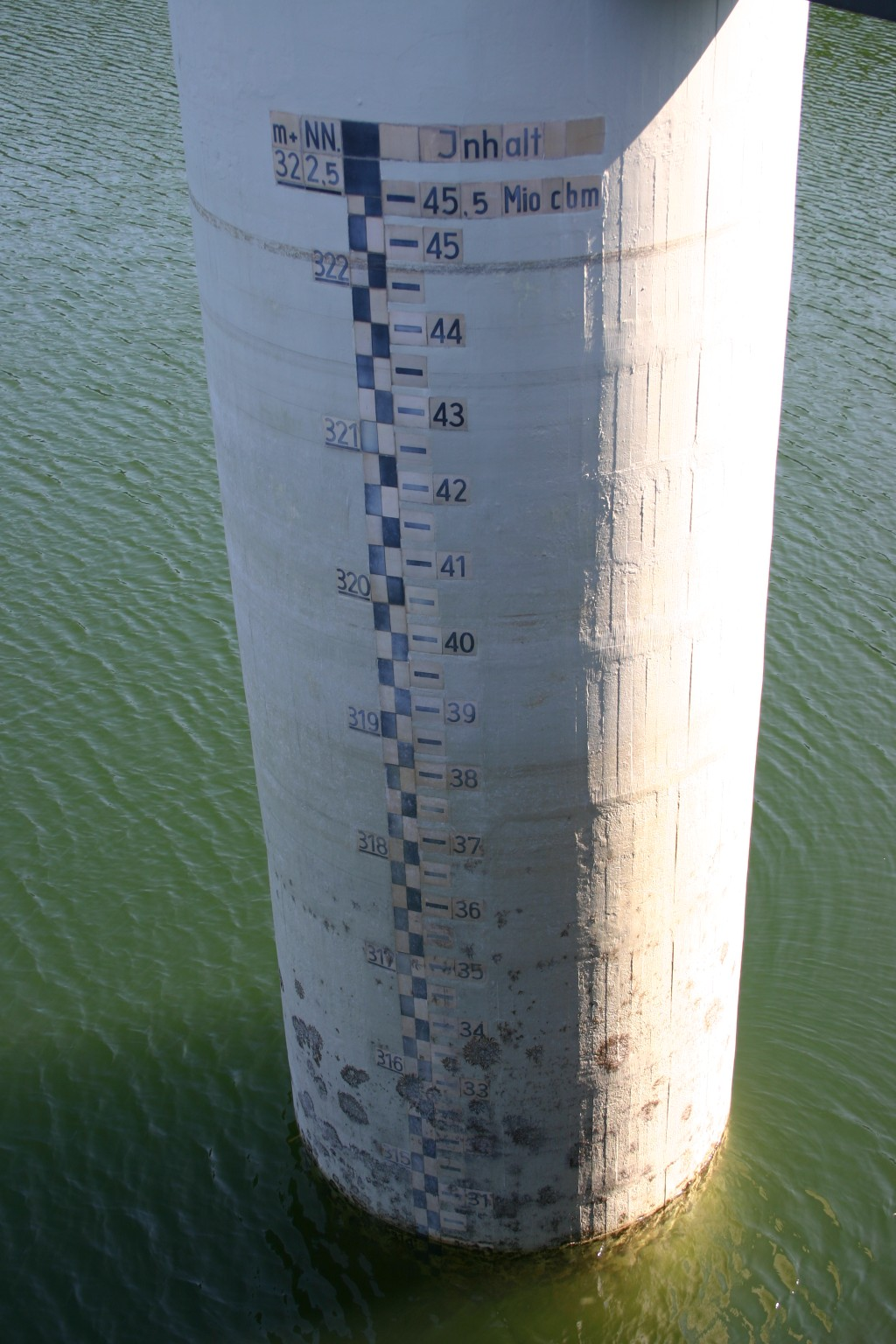
Bottom outlet tower of the Urft Dam with its water level markings

The Urft Reservoir (Urftstausee or Urftsee), which when full is 7.85 km long according to the Deutsche Grundkarte map, although the straight-line distance from the head of the lake to the dam is only about 3.9 km), has a total area of 2.16 km^{2} and holds up to 47.75 million cubic metres of water. The River Urft flows through it from east to west. It is located within the district of Euskirchen south of the Kermeter ridge, west-northwest of Gemünd in the borough of Schleiden and slightly below the village of Malsbenden. Places from which the reservoir may be reached are Gemünd and Malsbenden or south through the Kermeter from Heimbach.

At the northwest end of the snaking waters of the Urft Reservoir and just below the Urft Dam is the Obersee lake, which acts as the main pre-basin for the Rur Reservoir and in which both the Rur and the Urft are impounded. In the Urft Reservoir (322.5 m above sea level (NN)), which is surrounded by wooded countryside, lies the island of Krummenauel (max 339.6 m above NN). The peninsulas at Altenberg (Auf dem Altenberg; max. 351.5 m above NN), Neffgesberg (max 370 m above NN) and Hosterauel (max 366.7 m above NN) jut out into the lake. They can also be reached on foot depending on the water level.

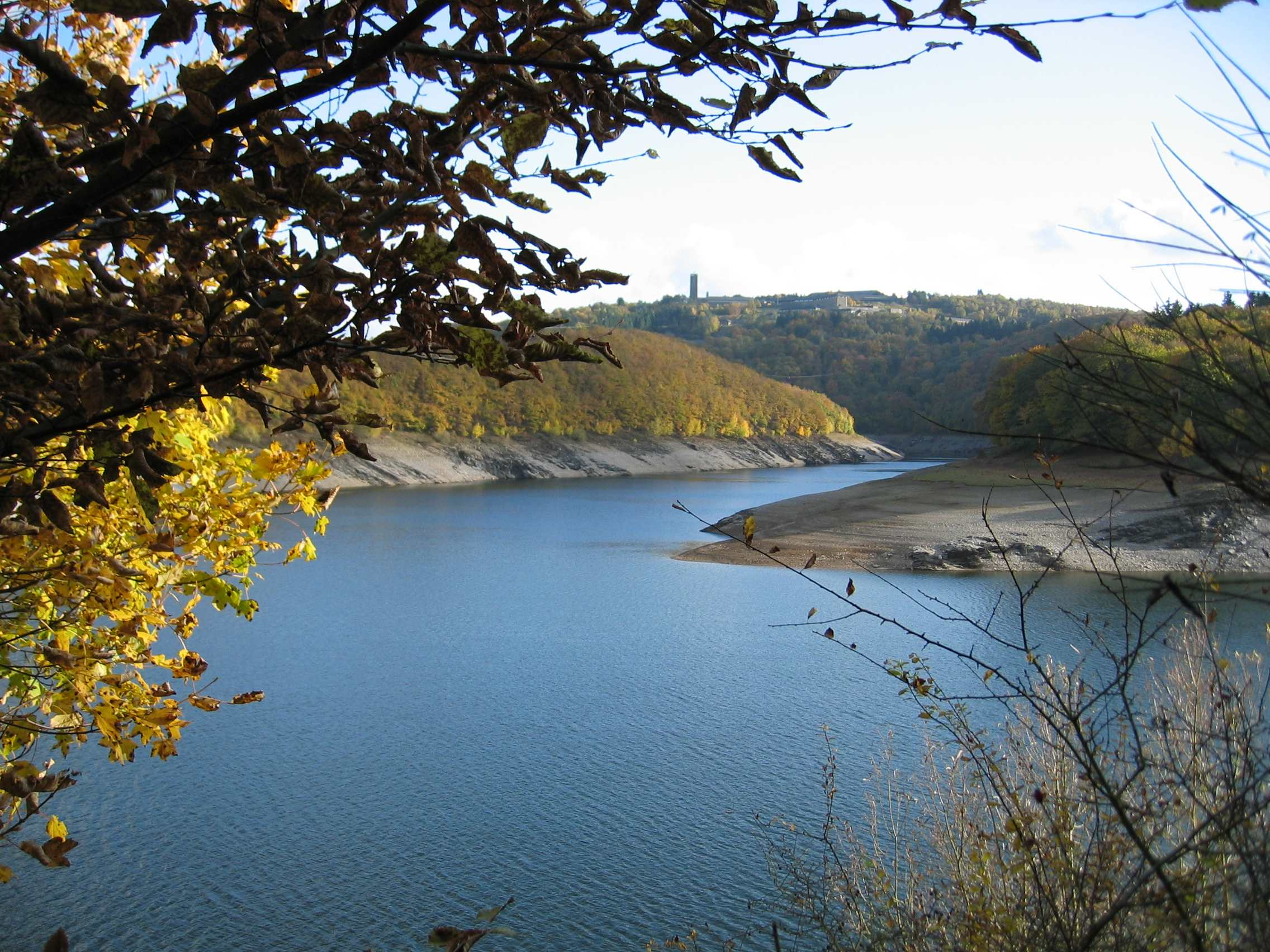
Urft Reservoir, October 2009

== See also ==
- List of dams in Germany
- List of reservoirs by volume

== Literature ==
- Talsperren in der Bundesrepublik Deutschland, Peter Franke, Wolfgang Frey, DNK – DVWK 1987, ISBN 3-926520-00-0
