= Wolfgarten =

- Stadtteil of Schleiden
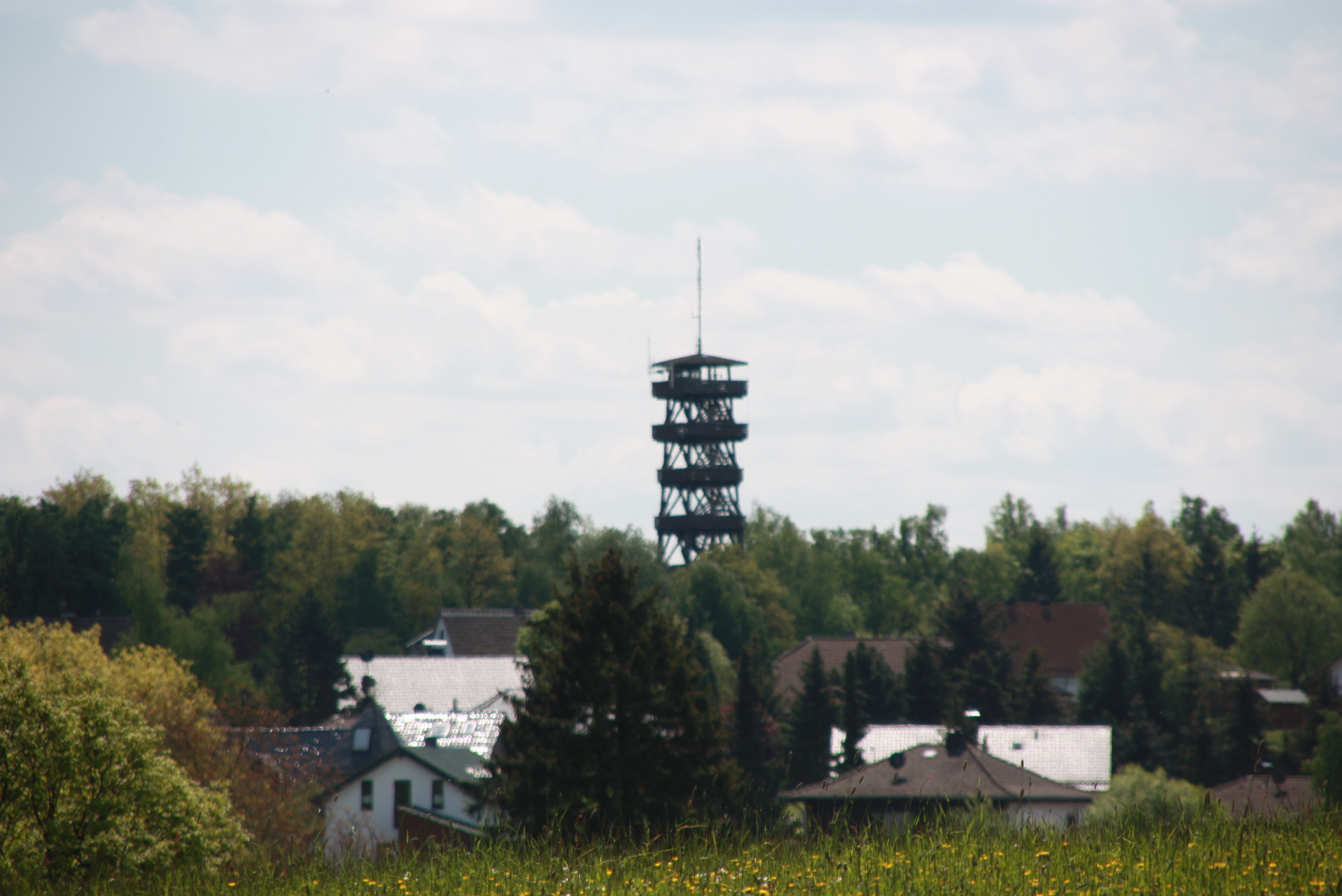
- Wolfgarten and its old fire watchtower
- Interactive map of Wolfgarten
- Location within Germany Location within North Rhine-Westphalia
- Coordinates: 50°35′25″N 6°29′34″E
- Country: Germany
- State: North Rhine-Westphalia
- Town: Schleiden
- Elevation: 511 m (1,677 ft)

Population (2021)
  - Total: 195
- Time zone: UTC+01:00 (CET)
  - Summer (DST): UTC+02:00 (CEST)
- Postal codes: 53937
- Dialling codes: 02444

Wolfgarten is a village in the north of the borough of Schleiden in the Eifel mountains in the county of Euskirchen in the German state of North Rhine-Westphalia. The village has a population of about 195.

== Location ==
Wolfgarten lies in the Kermeter, a hill ridge in the North Eifel within the Eifel National Park. Among the larger streams here are the Lorbach and Großer Böttenbach, which rise north-northwest and north of the village and flow into the Urft Reservoir to the west, and the Eselsbach, which rises east of the settlement and empties into the eastward-flowing Rotbach. On the southeastern edge of the village on the highest (unnamed) point of the Kermeter (527.8 m above sea level (NHN)) is the old Wolfgarten fire watchtower, which was used as a viewing tower until it collapsed in a fire on 13 June 2017. On the northeastern and eastern edge are the forester's lodges of Mariawald and Wolfgarten respectively.

== History ==
Wolfgarten was founded around 1470 as an emphyteutic estate (Erbpachthof) under the suzerainty of Jülich, and is the place of origin of the family of Wolfgarten, who also spell their name "Wolffgarten".

In the early 19th century, Wolfgarten belonged to the French-occupied mairie of Gemünd.

In accordance with § 9 of the 1971 Aachen Act, the village was incorporated into the new borough of Schleiden on 1 January 1972.

== Transport ==
The L 249 runs through Wolfgarten. Its nearest motorway junctions are Bad Münstereifel / Mechernich on the A 1 and Aachen-Lichtenbusch on the A 44.
