= Kall, North Rhine-Westphalia =

Kall
- Municipality
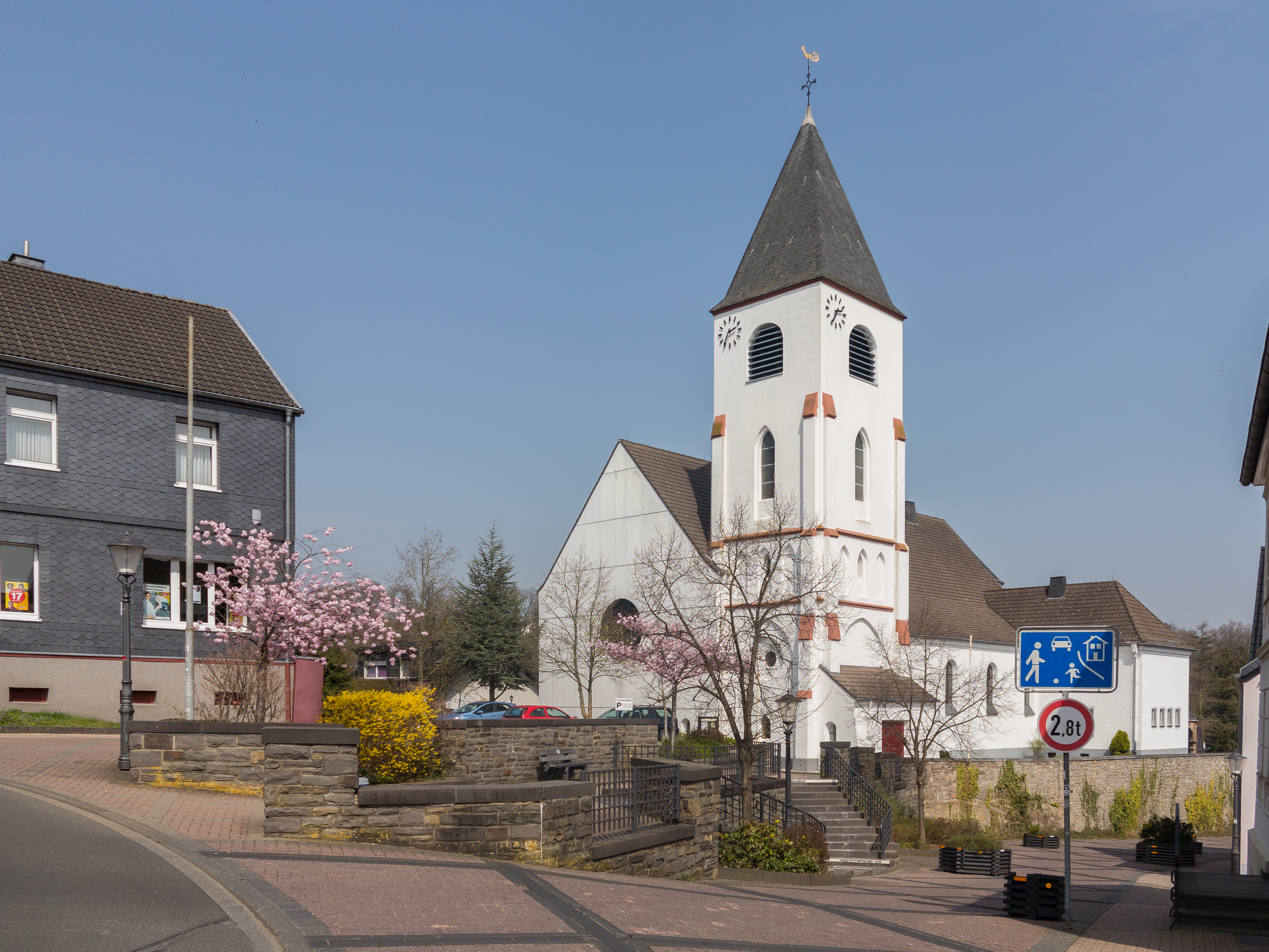

- Flag Coat of arms

- Location of Kall within Euskirchen district
- Interactive map of Kall
- Location within Germany Location within North Rhine-Westphalia
- Coordinates: 50°33′N 06°33′E
- Country: Germany
- State: North Rhine-Westphalia
- Admin. region: Köln
- District: Euskirchen

Government
  - Mayor (2025–30): Emmanuel Kunz (SPD)

Area
  - Total: 66.07 km^{2} (25.51 sq mi)
- Elevation: 399 m (1,309 ft)

Population (2025-12-31)
  - Total: 11,133
  - Density: 168.5/km^{2} (436.4/sq mi)
- Time zone: UTC+01:00 (CET)
  - Summer (DST): UTC+02:00 (CEST)
- Postal codes: 53925
- Dialling codes: 02441, 02445, 02447, 02482, 02486
- Vehicle registration: EU
- Website: www.kall.de

Kall (German pronunciation: [kal]) is a municipality in the district of Euskirchen in the state of North Rhine-Westphalia, Germany. It is located in the Eifel hills, approximatively 20 km south-west of Euskirchen.

Kall consists of the following districts: Anstois, Benenberg, Diefenbach, Dottel, Frohnrath, Gillenberg, Golbach, Keldenich, Krekel, Rinnen, Roder, Rüth, Scheven, Sistig, Sötenich, Steinfeld, Steinfelderheistert, Straßbüsch, Urft, Wahlen, Wallenthal, Wallenthalerhöhe, and Kall itself.

Most important river within Kall is the Urft, a tributary to the Roer. Parts of Kall belong to Eifel National Park.

Kall had been affected by 2021 European floods. Three persons died, also rail installations and residential buildings had been damaged.

== Population ==
Historical population

Year	Pop.	±% p.a.
1965	9,147	—
1970	9,566	+0.90%
1975	9,274	−0.62%
1980	9,402	+0.27%
1985	9,828	+0.89%
1990	10,323	+0.99%
1995	11,194	+1.63%

Year	Pop.	±% p.a.
2000	11,689	+0.87%
2005	11,998	+0.52%
2010	11,817	−0.30%
2015	11,229	−1.02%
2020	11,096	−0.24%
2025	11,133	+0.07%

Source: Landesdatabank Nordrhein-Westfalen
