= Urft (river) =

River of North Rhine-Westphalia, Germany

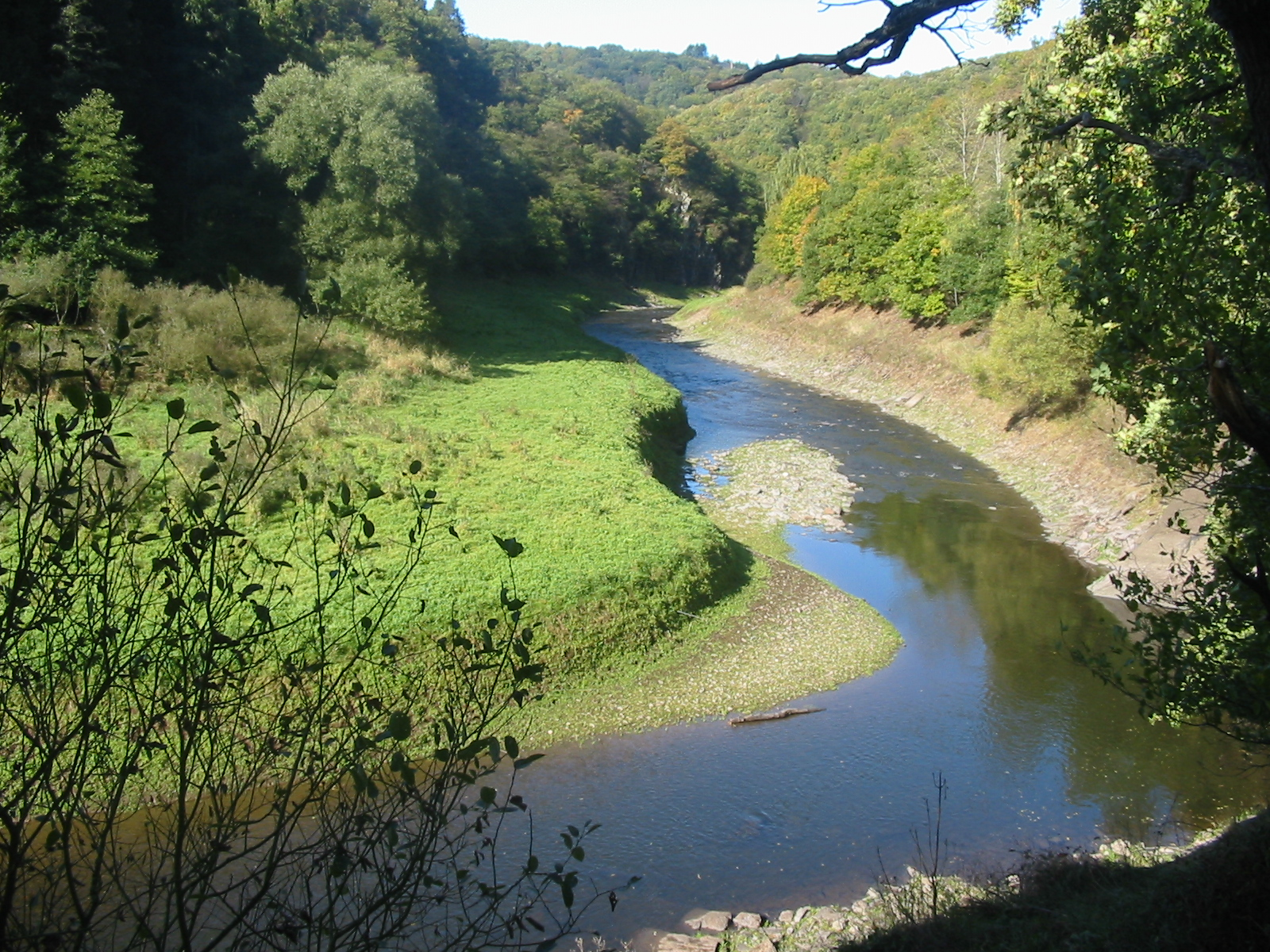
- The Urft near Gemünd in the Urft Reservoir at low water

Location
- Country: Germany
- State: North Rhine-Westphalia
- District: Euskirchen
- Region: North Eifel
- Reference no.: DE: 2822

Physical characteristics
- Source
  - location: In the North Eifel near Schmidtheim
  - coordinates: 50°25′05″N 6°30′12″E
  - elevation: ca. 581 m above sea level (NHN)
- Mouth
  - location: Near Rurberg into the Rur / in the upper basin of the Rur Dam
  - coordinates: 50°36′08″N 6°25′07″E
  - elevation: 279.6 m above sea level (NHN)
- Length: 46.373 km (28.815 mi)
- Basin size: 372.564 km^{2} (143.848 sq mi)

Basin features
- Progression: Rur→ Meuse→ North Sea
- Tributaries
  - left: Olef (for this and others see below)
  - right: Genfbach (for this and others see below)
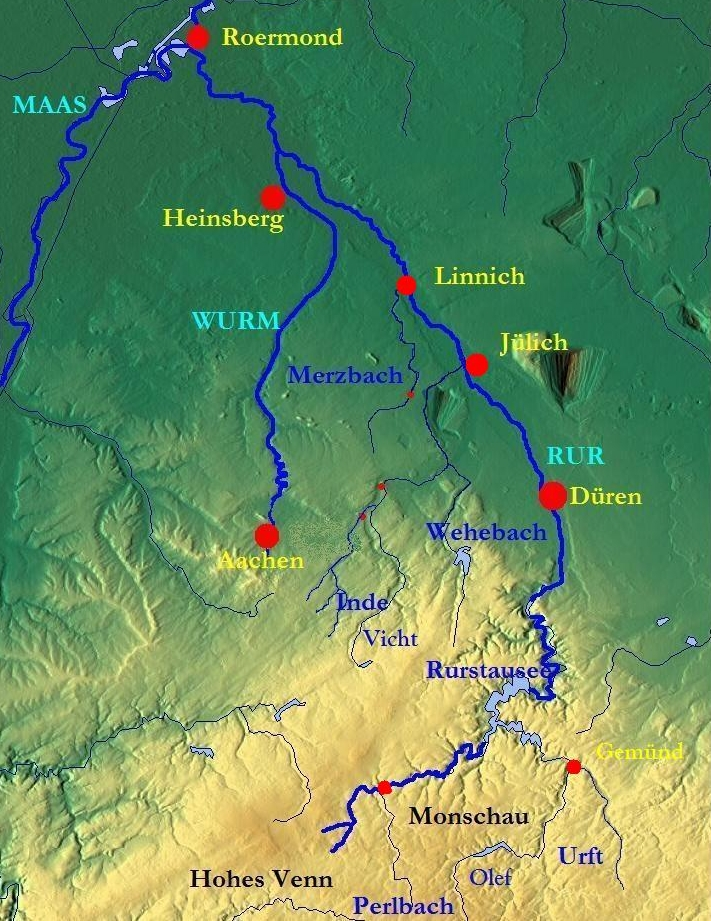
- The Rur inter alia with the courses of the Urft, Inde, Merzbach and Wurm

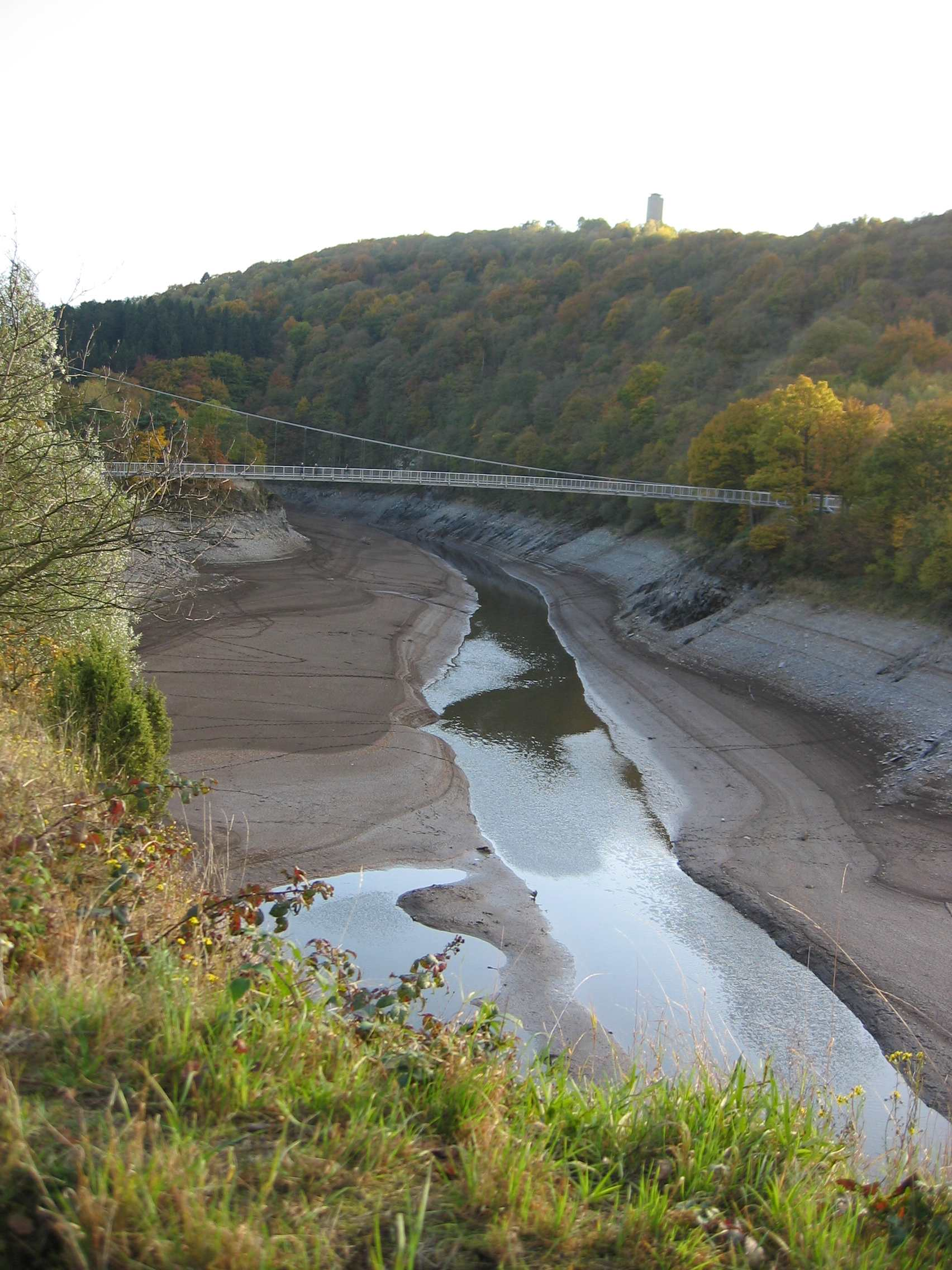
Urft Reservoir basin at low water and the Victor Neels Bridge, Urft and, on the horizon, the tower of the Vogelsang Fortress

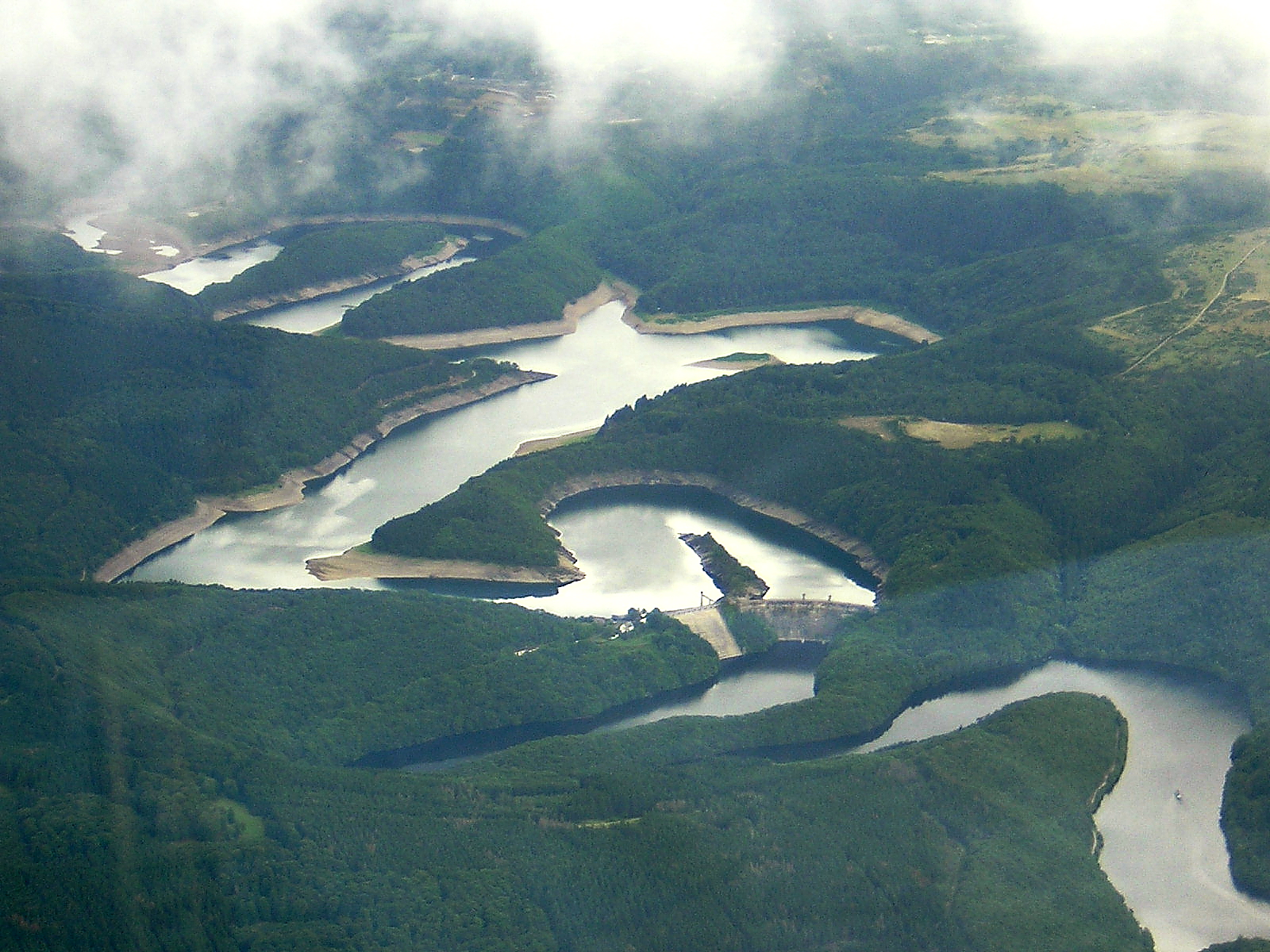
Urft Reservoir and immediately below it the upper basin of the Rur Dam

The Urft (German pronunciation: [ʊʁft]) is a 46.4-kilometre-long (28.8 mi) right-hand tributary of the Rur in the county of Euskirchen in the German state of North Rhine-Westphalia. It flows through the village of Urft in the municipality of Kall. The Urft rises in the North Eifel region of the Eifel Mountains.

== Origin of the name ==
The name of the Urft is derived from Urd-apa. The origin of the word Urd is unknown, but apa is Celtic and means "stream". In 1075, the Urft was called the Urdefa, in 1419 the Orfft and, in 1503, the Oyrfft. The village of Urft takes its name from the river.

== Course ==
The Urft rises in the North Eifel in the High Fens-Eifel Nature Park. Its source is in the Dahlem Forest (Dahlemer Wald), 3.8 km (2.4 mi) west of the Dahlem village of Schmidtheim and 2.3 km (1.4 mi) (both as the crow flies) northwest of Dahlemer Binz Airfield.

The Urft initially flows through Schmidtheim. From there, it is accompanied by the Eifel Line and joined by the Dänenbach stream. It then flows through the village of Blankenheim-Wald, where it collects the Wisselbach and is crossed by the B 258 federal highway. In the next section, it is joined by more streams including the Treisbach, the Laufbach and the Haubach. At Steinrütsch, which lies in the parish of Nettersheim and where there are the remains of a Roman burgus and castellum (Kleinkastell), it is joined by the Wellenbach in Urft and in Nettersheim the Genfbach. Next, the river runs parallel to the Roman Eifel Aqueduct, which begins at the old Gronrecht Mill (Gronrechtsmühle) near the Grüner Pütz, flows through Urft, where it meets the Gillesbach and, below the village, the Kuttenbach. After that, the Urft flows through Sötenich and Kall, where it leaves both the Eifel Line and the Eifel Aqueduct and collects the Kallbach, before running along the Olef Valley Railway and through Anstois. Next, it passes through Gemünd, where the Olef joins and where the B 265 and B 266 cross the Urft in the village. It then leaves the railway and flows through Malsbenden.

Next, the Urft flows into the Urft Reservoir, which channels its waters usually into a tunnel - the Kermeter Gallery - through the Kermeter ridge north of the reservoir and through the turbines of the Heimbach Power Station with its outflow into the compensating basin of the Heimbach Dam and thus eventually into the Rur. Through this artificial outflow tunnel, the mouth of the Urft is near the Heimbach village of Hasenfeld at Rur 111.1 km (69.0 mi). Before the construction of the Urft Dam, the river emptied in a natural way above the Simmerath village of Rurberg roughly at Rur 123.5 km (76.7 mi) into the Rur. Since the second expansion stage of the Rur Reservoir in 1959, the water from the Obersee on the Rur Dam impounds the old lower reaches of the Urft (near its confluence) on the downstream side of the Urft Dam to a depth of around 12 metres (39 ft). From there, the reservoir waters flow, at high water, over the spillway of the Urft Dam.

== Catchment area and tributaries ==
The catchment area of the Urft covers 372.564 km^{2} (143.85 sq mi), and drains via the Rur, Meuse and Hollands Diep into the North Sea.

Tributaries of the Urft
GKZ	Name	Length		Catchment		Direction	Confluence		Confluence
		km	mi	km^{2}	sqmi		km	mi	location
2822112	N.N.	1.7	1.1			left	43.8	27.2	
2822114	N.N.	2.5	1.6			left	43.6	27.1	
2822116	N.N.	1.9	1.2			right	43.7	27.2	
282212	Dänenbach	5.7	3.5	4.784	1.847	left	40.1	24.9	Schmidtheim
2822132	Zehnbach	1.3	0.8			right	39.5	24.5	
282214	Wisselbach	3.5	2.2	2.314	0.893	left	38.3	23.8	Blankenheim-Wald
2822152	Schäferbach	1.7	1.1			right	37.8	23.5	Blankenheim-Wald
2822154	N.N.	0.9	0.6			right	37.1	23.1	
2822156	Treisbach	2.8	1.7			left	36.2	22.5	
282216	Haubach	3.4	2.1	7.057	2.725	right	35.2	21.9	
2822172	Laufbach	2.2	1.4			left	34.9	21.7	
2822174	Lützertseifen	1.5	0.9			right	34.5	21.4	
2822176	Gelensiefen	1.4	0.9			left	33.3	20.7	
2822178	Wellenbach	2.5	1.6			right	31.7	19.7	
282218	Schleifbach	3.9	2.4	3.961	1.529	left	30.8	19.1	Nettersheim
28222	Genfbach	9.6	6.0	20.102	7.761	right	29.4	18.3	Nettersheim
28224	Gillesbach	6.6	4.1	15.644	6.040	left	23.2	14.4	Urft
282252	Kuttenbach	5.3	3.3	4.488	1.733	left	22.3	13.9	Urft
28226	Kallbach	7.2	4.5	15.007	5.794	left	18.4	11.4	Kall
282272	An den Fuchslöchern	1.7	1.1			right	16.8	10.4	Kall
2822732	Fahrenbach	2.8	1.7			left	16.7	10.4	Kall
28227392	Dränkensief	1.6	1.0			left	16.2	10.1	
282274	Mastermühle	1.4	0.9			right	16.2	10.1	
282276	Im Rödchen	1.4	0.9			left	15.2	9.4	
282278	Mühlenbach	1.3	0.8			left	13.1	8.1	
2822792	Seelbach	0.9	0.6			right	13.1	8.1	Gemünd
28228	Olef	28.1	17.5	196.073	75.704	left	11.7	7.3	Gemünd
2822912	Lompig	1.1	0.7			right	10.5	6.5	Gemünd
2822914	Großer Scheuerbach	1.1	0.7			right	11.1	6.9	Gemünd
2822918	Braubach	3.5	2.2			left	11.3	7.0	Gemünd
2822992	Horrenbach	1.8	1.1			left	9.4	5.8	Gemünd
28229936	Laßbach	2.3	1.4			left	8.2	5.1	
2822994	Großer Böttenbach	3.0	1.9			right	7.1	4.4	
28229952	Morsbach	2.3	1.4			left	6.3	3.9	
2822996	Lorbach	3.0	1.9			right	4.9	3.0	
28229972	Amselbach	2.1	1.3			right	4.8	3.0	
28229974	Hohenbach	1.6	1.0			right	2.8	1.7	
2822998	Vom Walberhof	2.5	1.6			left	2.3	1.4	
28229992	Haftenbach	0.6	0.4			left	0.9	0.6	

== See also ==
- List of rivers of North Rhine-Westphalia

== Literature ==
- Hans Peter Schiffer: Das Urfttal in der Eifel. Landschaft, Natur, Geschichte. 2nd edn., LandpresseRegio, Weilerswist, 2006.
