= Rur Eifel =

Coordinates: 50.6198°N 6.415°E

The Dürener Rur Eifel (German: Dürener Rureifel) lies in the district of Düren in the German state of North Rhine-Westphalia, and is a local recreation area from the regions of Cologne, Aachen, Düsseldorf, Krefeld, Mönchengladbach and Bonn. Its name comes from the river Rur and the Eifel Mountains. To this touristic region belong Nideggen, Heimbach, Hürtgenwald and Kreuzau. It had been the operating area of the Rureifel-Tourismus e.V. until 2020.

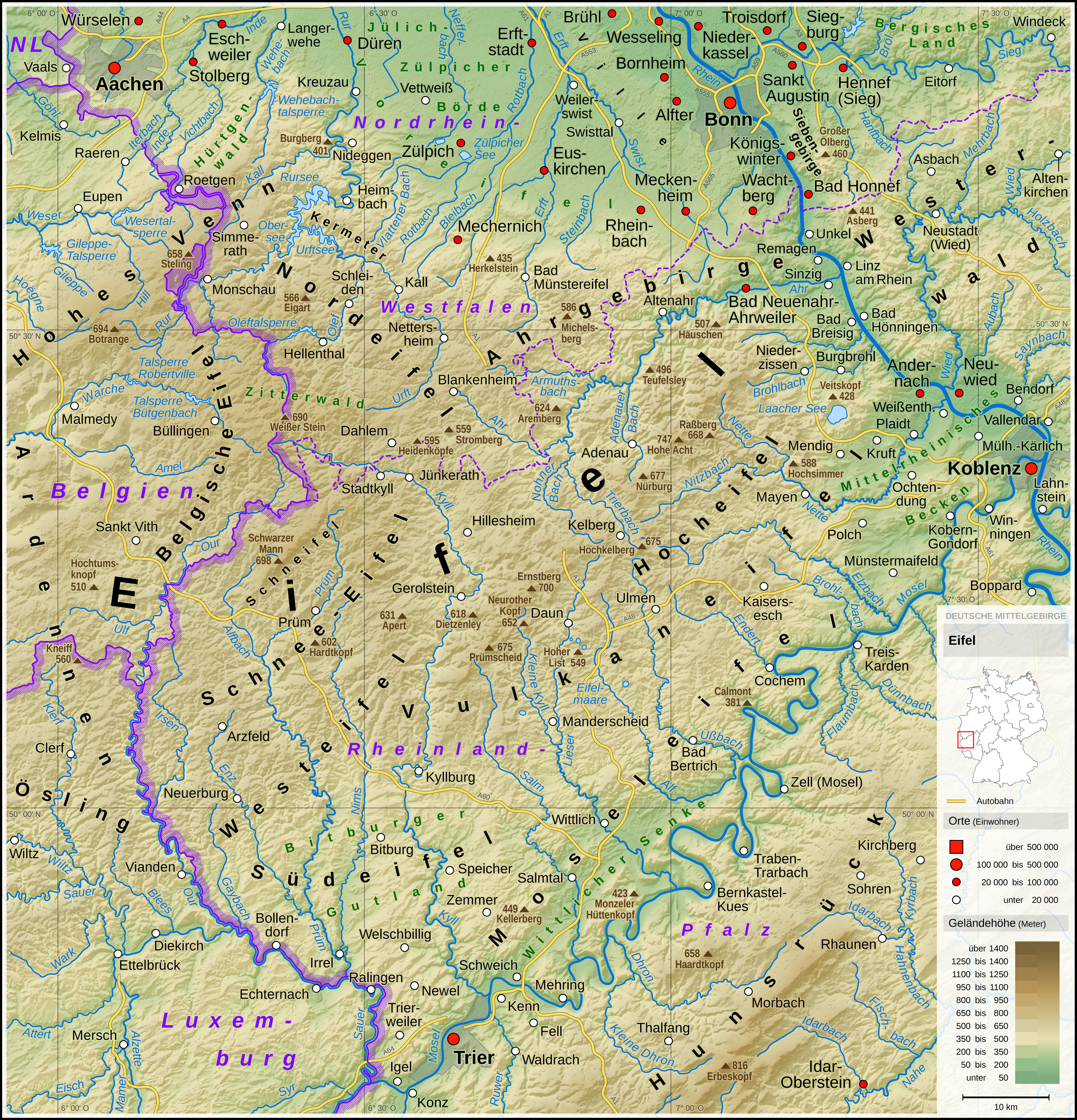
Map of the Eifel, which the Rur Eifel lies in

Also towns and municipalities within the Städteregion Aachen, Stolberg, Roetgen, Simmerath and Monschau have been included into the work area of Rureifel Tourismus GmbH since 2021

The Naturpark Eifel (Eifel Forest Park) defines also Schleiden and Hellenthal, within the district of Euskirchen as parts of the Rur Eifel.

This holiday and day-excursion region is widely known for having the second largest dam in Europe, the Schwammenauel, or Rur Dam, the Eifel National Park and a part of the Deutsch-Belgischen Naturpark Hohes Venn - Eifel.
