= Simmerath =

- Municipality
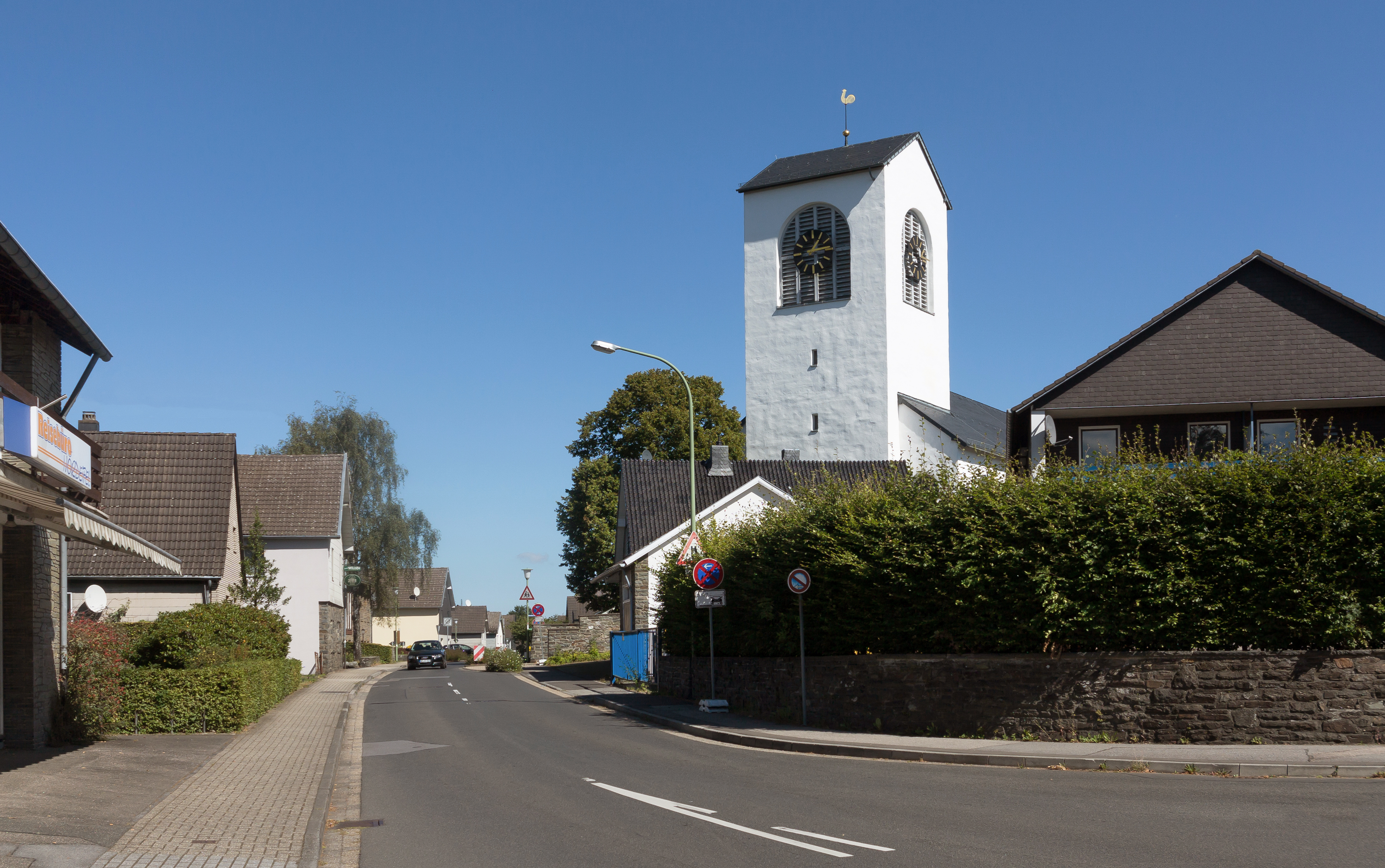

- Flag Coat of arms

- Location of Simmerath within Aachen district
- Interactive map of Simmerath
- Location within Germany Location within North Rhine-Westphalia
- Coordinates: 50°36′25″N 6°18′00″E
- Country: Germany
- State: North Rhine-Westphalia
- Admin. region: Köln
- District: Aachen
- Subdivisions: 17

Government
  - Mayor (2020–25): Bernd Goffart (CDU)

Area
  - Total: 110.92 km^{2} (42.83 sq mi)
- Elevation: 280–560 m (920–1,840 ft)

Population (2025-12-31)
  - Total: 16,496
  - Density: 148.72/km^{2} (385.18/sq mi)
- Time zone: UTC+01:00 (CET)
  - Summer (DST): UTC+02:00 (CEST)
- Postal codes: 52152
- Dialling codes: 02473
- Vehicle registration: AC, MON
- Website: www.simmerath.de

Simmerath (German pronunciation: [ˈzɪməʁaːt]) is a municipality in the district of Aachen, in North Rhine-Westphalia, Germany. It is located approximately 20 km south-east of Aachen, near the border to Belgium.

The administrative area was expanded in 1972 and includes the following localities:

- Dedenborn
- Eicherscheid
- Einruhr
- Erkensruhr
- Hammer
- Hirschrott
- Huppenbroich
- Kesternich
- Lammersdorf
- Paustenbach
- Rollesbroich
- Rurberg
- Witzerath
- Woffelsbach

== Population ==
Historical population

| Year | Pop. | ±% p.a. |
|---|---|---|
| 1965 | 9,782 | — |
| 1970 | 10,949 | +2.28% |
| 1975 | 12,388 | +2.50% |
| 1980 | 13,245 | +1.35% |
| 1985 | 13,844 | +0.89% |
| 1990 | 13,305 | −0.79% |
| 1995 | 14,525 | +1.77% |

| Year | Pop. | ±% p.a. |
|---|---|---|
| 2000 | 15,304 | +1.05% |
| 2005 | 15,771 | +0.60% |
| 2010 | 15,557 | −0.27% |
| 2015 | 15,266 | −0.38% |
| 2020 | 15,498 | +0.30% |
| 2025 | 16,496 | +1.26% |

Source: Landesdatabank Nordrhein-Westfalen

== Gallery ==
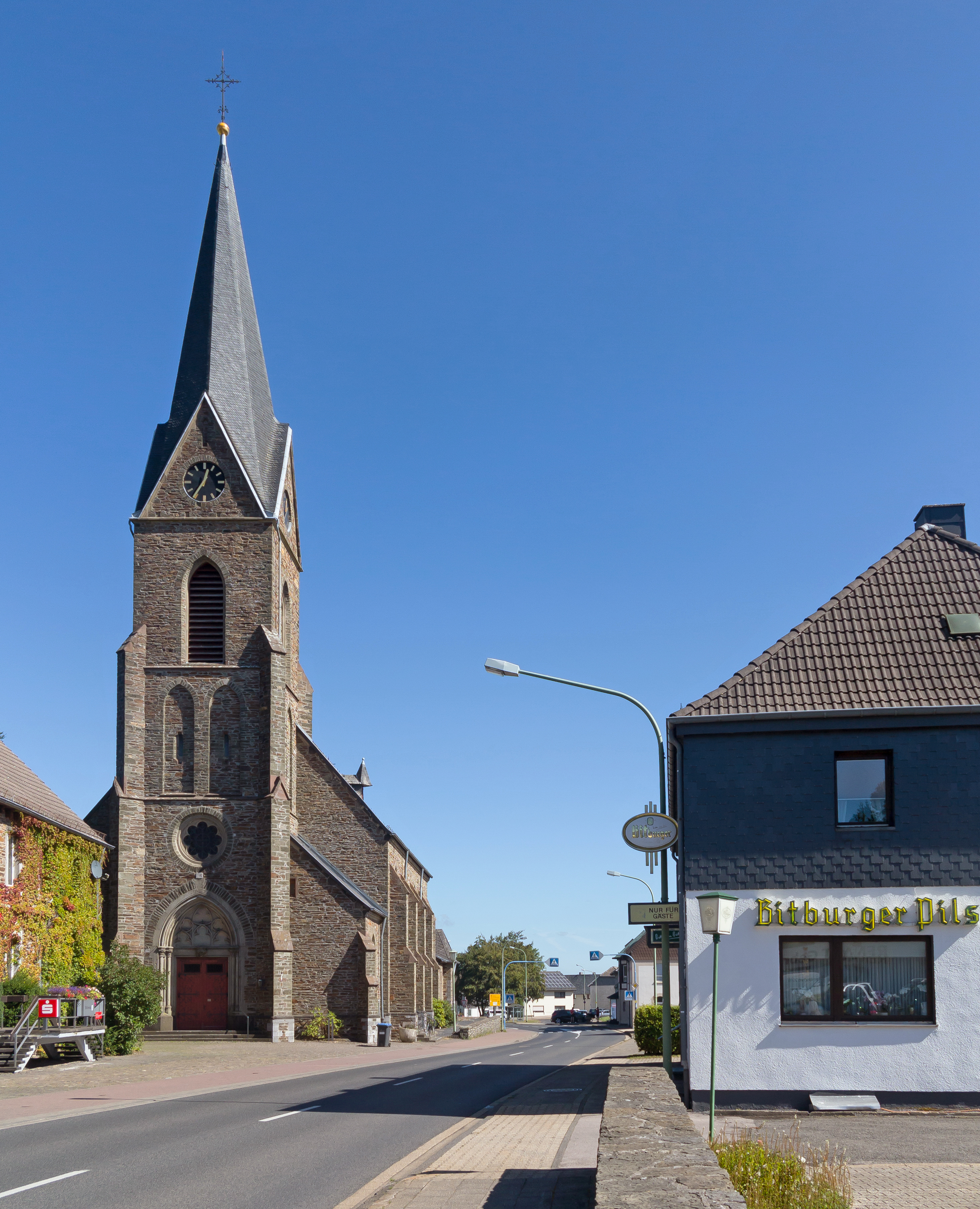
Lammersdorf, catholic church in the street

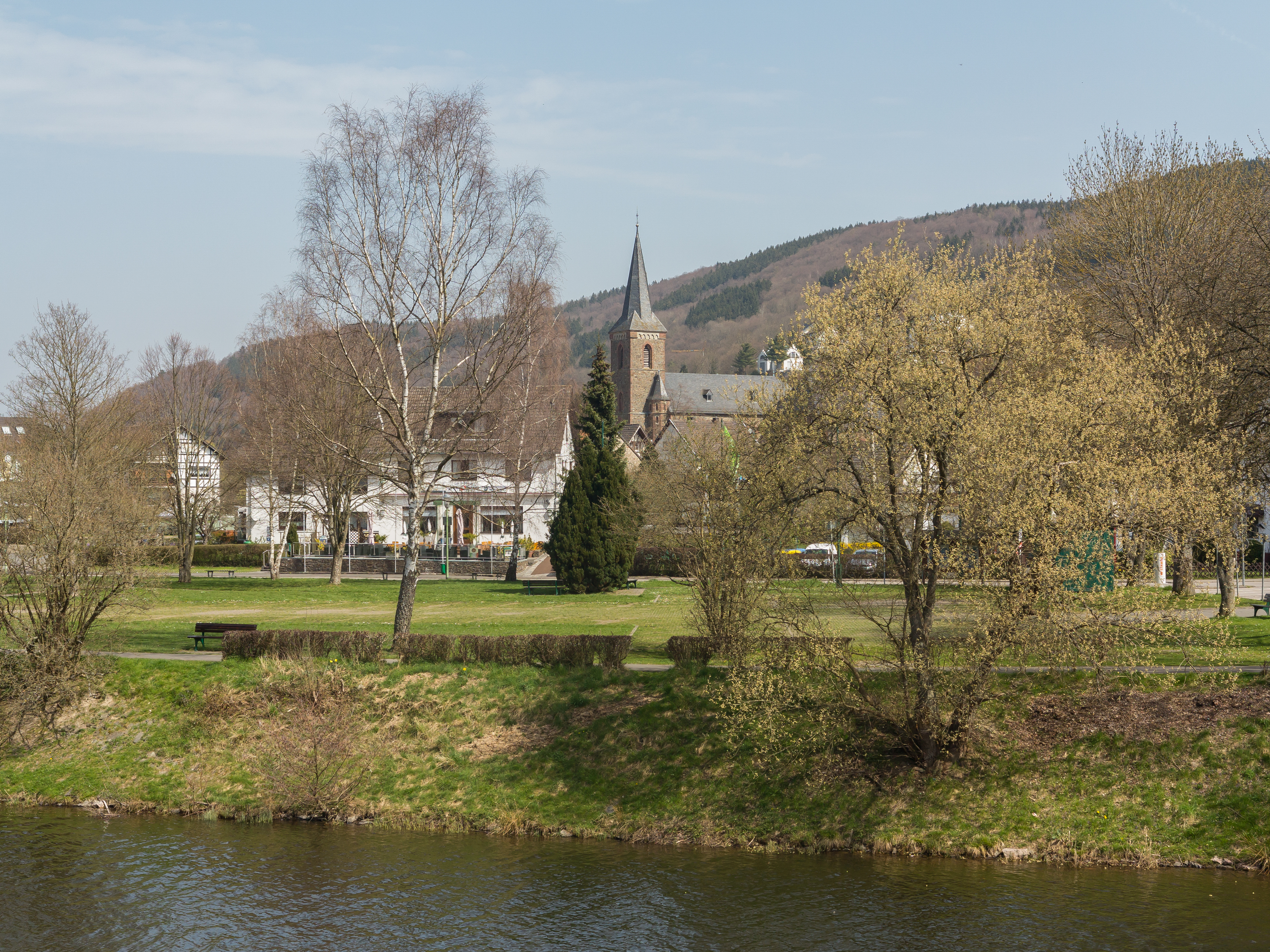
Einruhr, church of St. Nicholas in the village

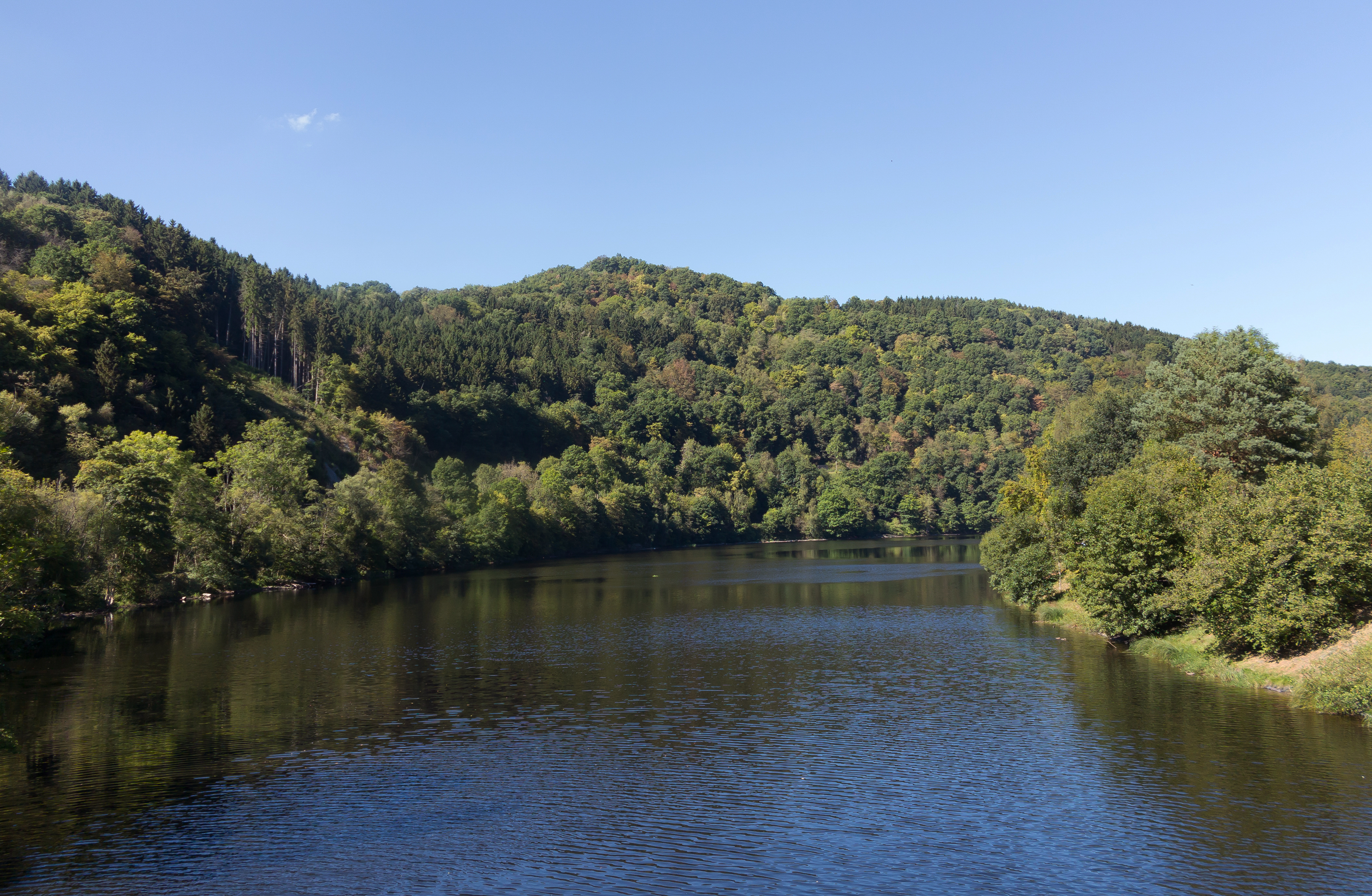
near Einruhr, river Rur

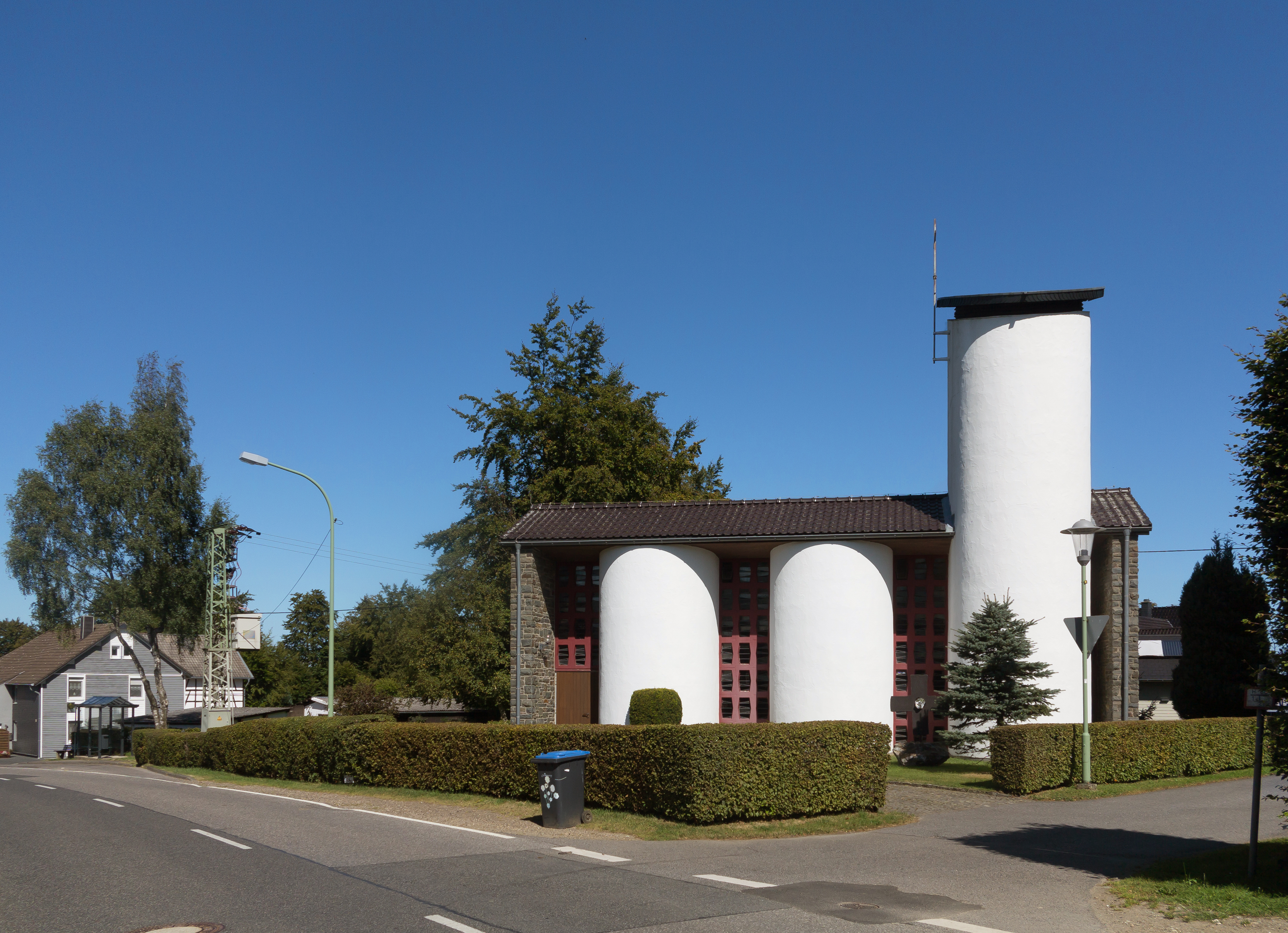
Paustenbach, view of a street
