= Rur Dam =

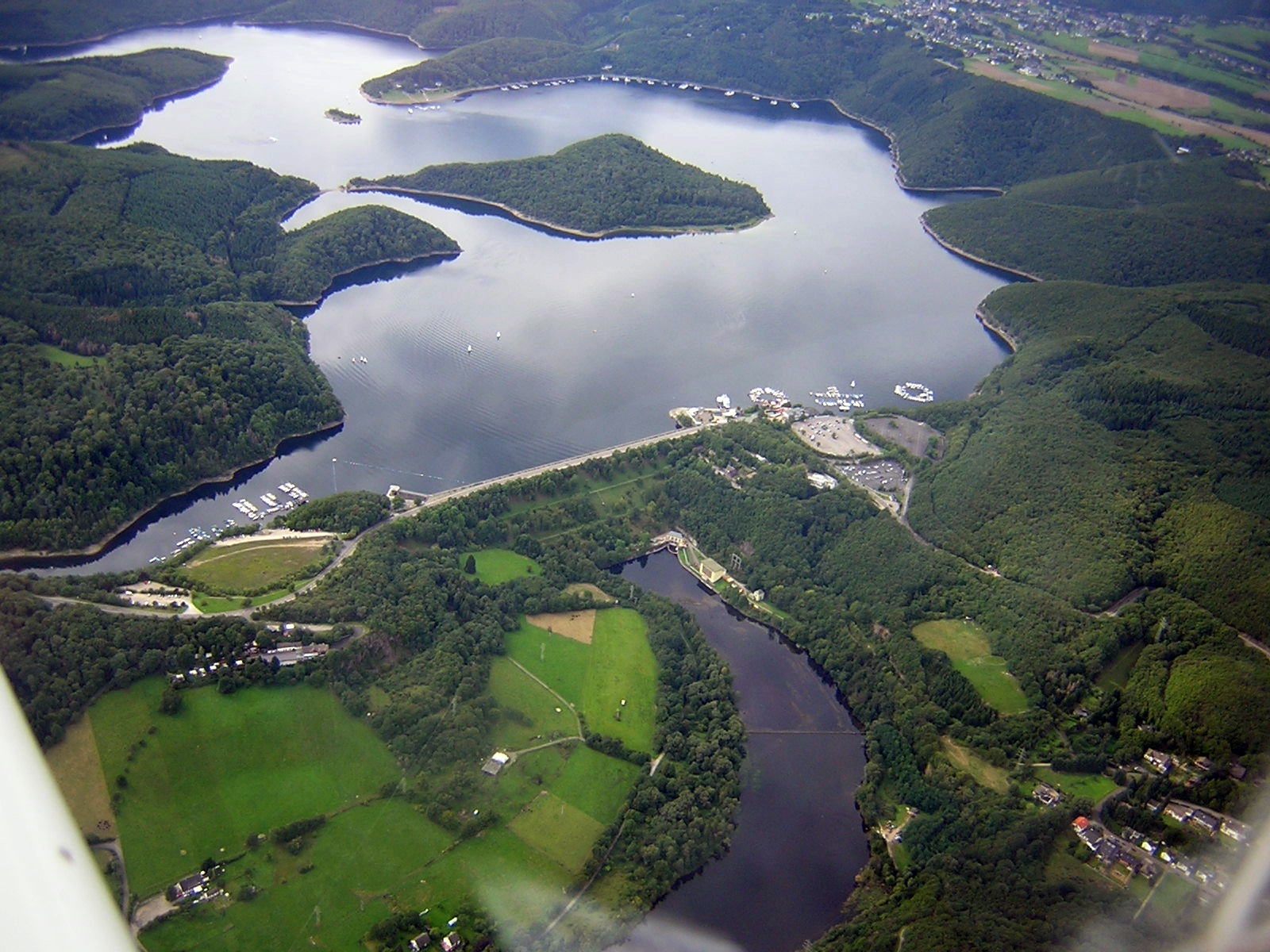
- Aerial shot of the Rur Dam, Schwammenauel and Roer Reservoir with the Tonsberg peninsula (left centre), island of Eichert (centre) and peninsula of Eschauel (rear right)
- Interactive map of Rur Dam
- Location: Städteregion Aachen, Kreis Düren
- Coordinates: 50°37′57″N 6°23′55″E
- Construction began: 1934–1938, 1955–1959 and 1961

Dam and spillways
- Impounds: Rur; others see below
- Height (foundation): 77.2 m (253 ft)
- Height (thalweg): 69.5 m (228 ft)
- Length: 480 m (1,570 ft)
- Elevation at crest: 284.43 m (933.2 ft)
- Width (crest): 15 m (49 ft)
- Dam volume: 2.6×10^{6} m^{3} (92×10^{6} cu ft)

Reservoir
- Total capacity: 203.2×10^{6} m^{3} (7.18×10^{9} cu ft)
- Active capacity: incl. Obersee 202.6×10^{6} m^{3} (7.15×10^{9} cu ft)
- Catchment area: 288.1 km^{3} (69.1 cu mi)
- Surface area: 7.83 km^{2} (3.02 sq mi)
- Maximum length: 10.6 km (6.6 mi)
- Normal elevation: 281.5 m (924 ft)

The Rur Dam (German: Rurtalsperre Schwammenauel) is a 77.2 metre high dam located in the southwestern part of the state of North Rhine-Westphalia in Germany. It was built in 1939 and impounds the Roer to form the Roer Reservoir (Rurstausee or Rursee) which is 7.83 km^{2} in area. It lies within the districts of Aachen and Düren.

== History ==
The original dam was built between 1934 and 1938 from earth and stone, with an inner lining of loam, coming into service in 1939. During the Second World War, on February 10, 1945, to impede the advance of the Anglo-Canadian 21st Army Group during Operation Veritable, water was released from the sluice gates; this delayed supportive action (Operation Grenade) by the American Ninth Army for two weeks. Construction from 1955 to 1959 raised the height of the dam by 20 meters to its present height of 77 meters above the riverbed.

== Headwaters and tailwaters ==
The headwaters of the Rur Reservoir, with their length in kilometres (km), according to the Deutsche Grundkarte map (sorted alphabetically):

- Allersbach (2.9 km); from Buhlert Ridge flowing from the west-northwest, empties into the central section of the reservoir
- Büdenbach (1.1 km); from the Kermeter flowing from the south, discharges near the dam wall in the northeastern part of the reservoir
- Eschbach (1 km); from the Kermeter flowing from the south, empties into the northeastern part of the reservoir
- Hohenbach (2.1 km); from the Kermeter flowing from the south, empties into the northeastern part of the reservoir
- Lederbach (1.1 km); from the Buhlert Ridge near the hamlet of Klaus flowing from the northwest, discharges into the central part of the reservoir
- Morsbach (1.2 km); from Schmidt-Eschauel flowing from the north, discharges into the central part of the reservoir
- Rur (164.5 km), the main headwater, flowing from the south and emptying into the southern end of the reservoir; forms the only natural tailwater
- Welchenbach (3.5 km); from the Monschauer Heckenland/from the direction of Simmerath in the west, discharges into the southern part of the reservoir
- Wolfsbach (2.2 km); from the Monschauer Heckenland/from Steckenborn (Simmerath) flowing from the west, discharges into the southern part of the reservoir
- Schilsbach, from Hechelscheidt/ Klaus, empties near Woffelsbach/ Schilsbachtal
- Weidenbach, empties near Rurberg/ Weidenbachtal

== Panorama ==
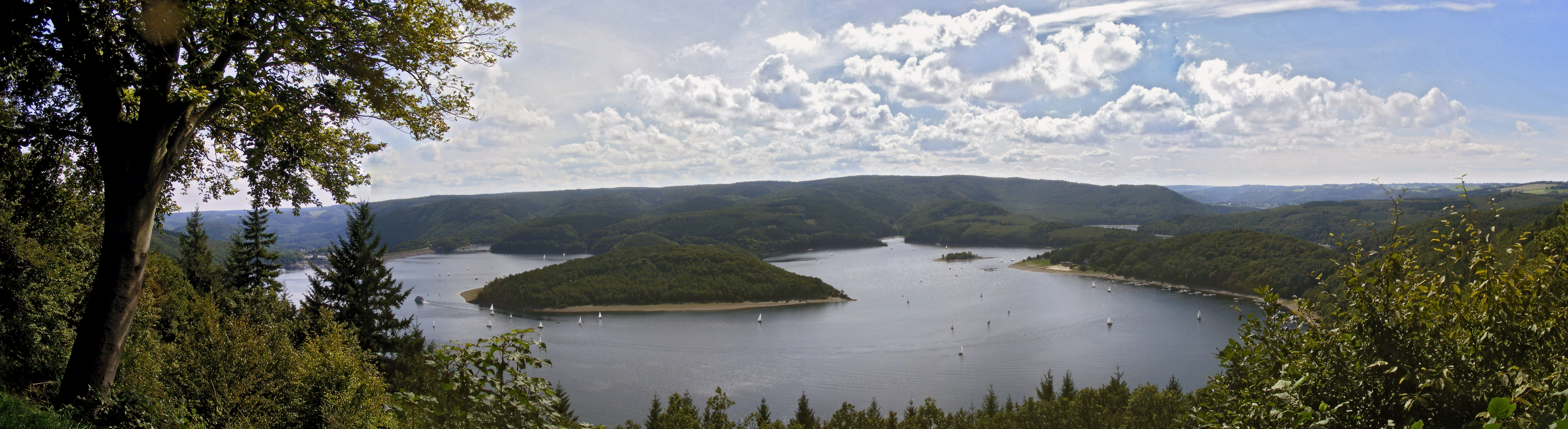
The Rur Reservoir as seen from the town of Schmidt in Nideggen with the island of Eichert in the middle and the Kermeter upland in the background.

== See also ==
- List of dams in Germany
- List of reservoirs by volume

== Literature ==
- Talsperren in der Bundesrepublik Deutschland, Peter Franke, Wolfgang Frey: DNK - DVWK 1987, ISBN 3-926520-00-0
