= Euskirchen (district) =

Coordinates: 50°30′N 6°40′E

- District
- Flag Coat of arms
- Country: Germany
- State: North Rhine-Westphalia
- Adm. region: Cologne
- Capital: Euskirchen

Government
  - District admin.: Markus Ramers (SPD)

Area
  - Total: 1,249.093 km^{2} (482.278 sq mi)

Population (31 December 2024)
  - Total: 202,609
  - Density: 162.205/km^{2} (420.109/sq mi)
- Time zone: UTC+01:00 (CET)
  - Summer (DST): UTC+02:00 (CEST)
- Vehicle registration: EU, SLE
- Website: http://www.kreis-euskirchen.de

Euskirchen (German pronunciation: [ˈɔʏskɪʁçn̩]) is a Kreis (district) in the south-west of North Rhine-Westphalia, Germany. Neighboring districts are Aachen, Düren, Rhein-Erft-Kreis, Rhein-Sieg, Ahrweiler, Daun, Bitburg-Prüm, and the Liège province (Belgium).

== History ==
In 1827, a first district around the city of Euskirchen was created, but it was much smaller than today. In 1932, the district of Rheinbach was dissolved, whereby the Euskirchen district gained its southern part. In 1972 the Euskirchen district grew again by the inclusion of the Schleiden district.

The district of Euskirchen was severely affected by the heavy rain and resulting flooding in July 2021. All towns and municipalities were affected. 27 people lost their lives, rail connections and highways were interrupted for years, and shopping zones were damaged. The most destructive flooding occurred along the Ahr, Erft, Olef, and Urft river systems.

== Geography ==
Geographically, the south-western half of the district is inside the Eifel hill chain. This land is hardly suitable for agriculture, and therefore in historical times the region was rather poor. Areas further to the north-east are more flat, belonging to Jülich-Zülpich Börde, a subregion of the Lower Rhine Bay, and have historically been used to grow a variety of crops, most notably sugar beets. The only other source of wealth was the iron ore, but today the many forests there make the area interesting for tourists.

Parts of the Euskirchen district belong to the Eifel National Park.

Some rivers have their upper reaches and sourches within Euskirchen district: Urft, a tributary of Roer, Erft, Ahr, Kyll (it has its source nearly at the border to Belgium)

== Coat of arms ==
The coat of arms shows the four signs of the main historical territories or rulers of the district. Top-left are the roses of the counts of Arenberg, top-right the lion of Jülich, bottom-right the wave-line of the counts of Manderscheid-Blankenheim, and bottom-left the Cologne cross. The coat of arms was granted in 1973.

== Towns and municipalities ==
Clickable map of towns and municipalities in the district

Towns
1. Bad Münstereifel (17,395)
2. Euskirchen (55,502)
3. Mechernich (26,776)
4. Schleiden (12,892)
5. Zülpich (19,689)
Municipalities
1. Blankenheim (8,534)
2. Dahlem (4,163)
3. Hellenthal (8,168)
4. Kall (11,306)
5. Nettersheim (7,475)
6. Weilerswist (15,824)
