= List of lakes of North Rhine-Westphalia =

Lakes in the North Rhine-Westphalia state of Germany are:

Lake Name	Elevation	Surface Area
Aasee, Bocholt	23.8 m (78 ft)	0.32 km^{2} (0.12 sq mi)
Aasee, Münster	54 m (177 ft)	0.402 km^{2} (0.155 sq mi)
Adolfosee	39 m (128 ft)	0.307 km^{2} (0.119 sq mi)
Biggesee		8.76 km^{2} (3.38 sq mi)
Bleibtreusee		0.378 km^{2} (0.146 sq mi)
Elfrather See	30 m (98 ft)	0.5 km^{2} (0.19 sq mi)
Erdfallsee	44 m (144 ft)	0.07 km^{2} (0.027 sq mi)
Gittruper See	40 m (130 ft)	
Großer Auesee	45 m (148 ft)	0.045 km^{2} (0.017 sq mi)
Großes Heiliges Meer	42.5 m (139 ft)	0.11 km^{2} (0.042 sq mi)
Hariksee		0.2 km^{2} (0.077 sq mi)
Heideweiher	45 m (148 ft)	0.02 km^{2} (0.0077 sq mi)
Hiltruper See	58 m (190 ft)	0.158 km^{2} (0.061 sq mi)
Hücker Moor	62.7 m (206 ft)	0.109 km^{2} (0.042 sq mi)
Lucherberger See		0.56 km^{2} (0.22 sq mi)
Naturschutzsee Füssenich		0.65 km^{2} (0.25 sq mi)
Norderteich	153 m (502 ft)	0.125 km^{2} (0.048 sq mi)
Oberlübber Bergsee	200 m (660 ft)	0.008 km^{2} (0.0031 sq mi)
Offlumer See	46 m (151 ft)	0.5 km^{2} (0.19 sq mi)
Otto-Maigler-See		
Sandruper See	43 m (141 ft)	0.11 km^{2} (0.042 sq mi)
Torfmoorsee		0.48 km^{2} (0.19 sq mi)
Wassersportsee Zülpich	154 m (505 ft)	0.85 km^{2} (0.33 sq mi)
