= Stommeln Synagogue =

Former synagogue and art venue in Stommeln, Germany

Coordinates: 51°1′11.1″N 6°45′31.9″E

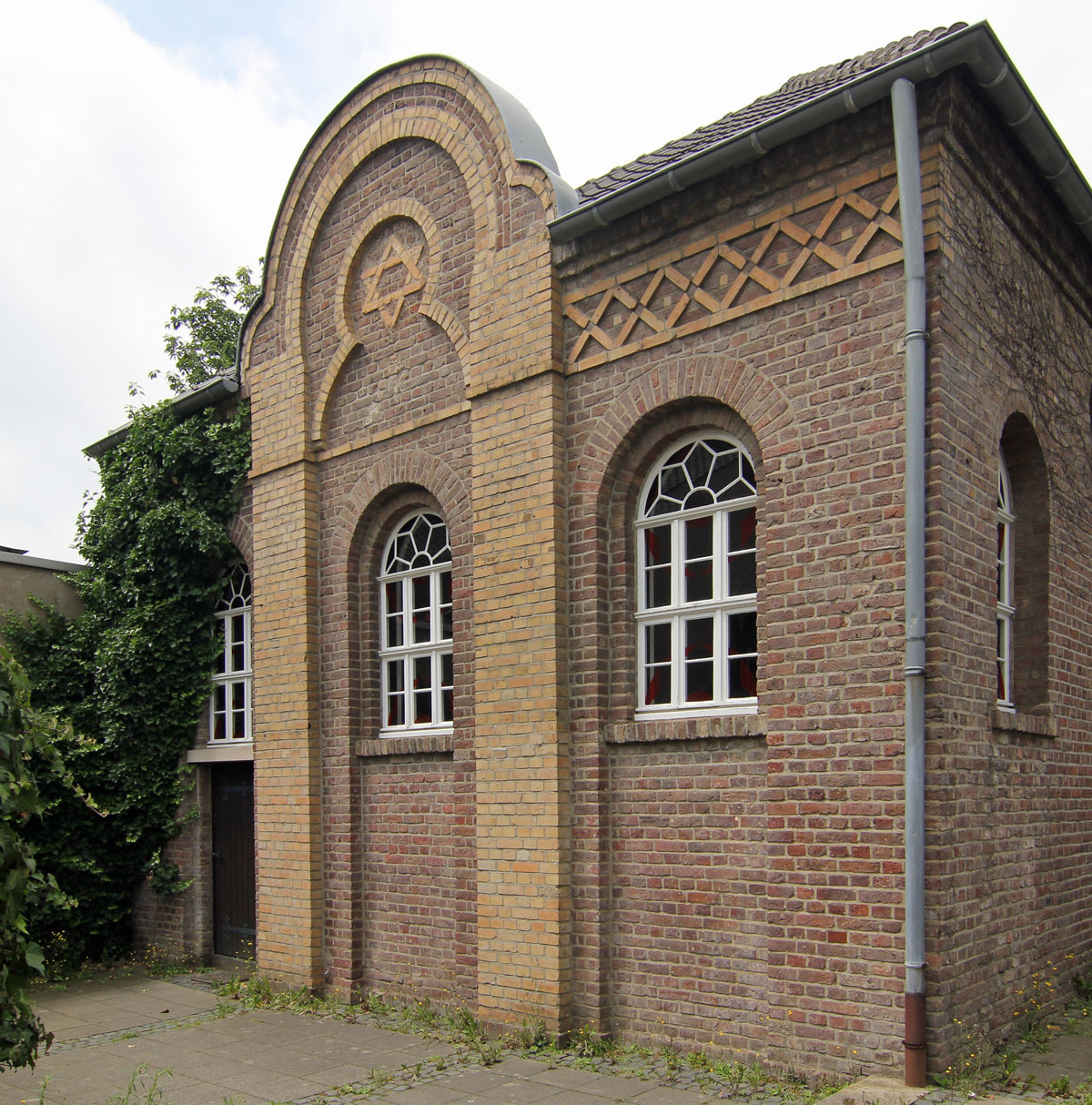
Synagogue in Stommeln (2011)

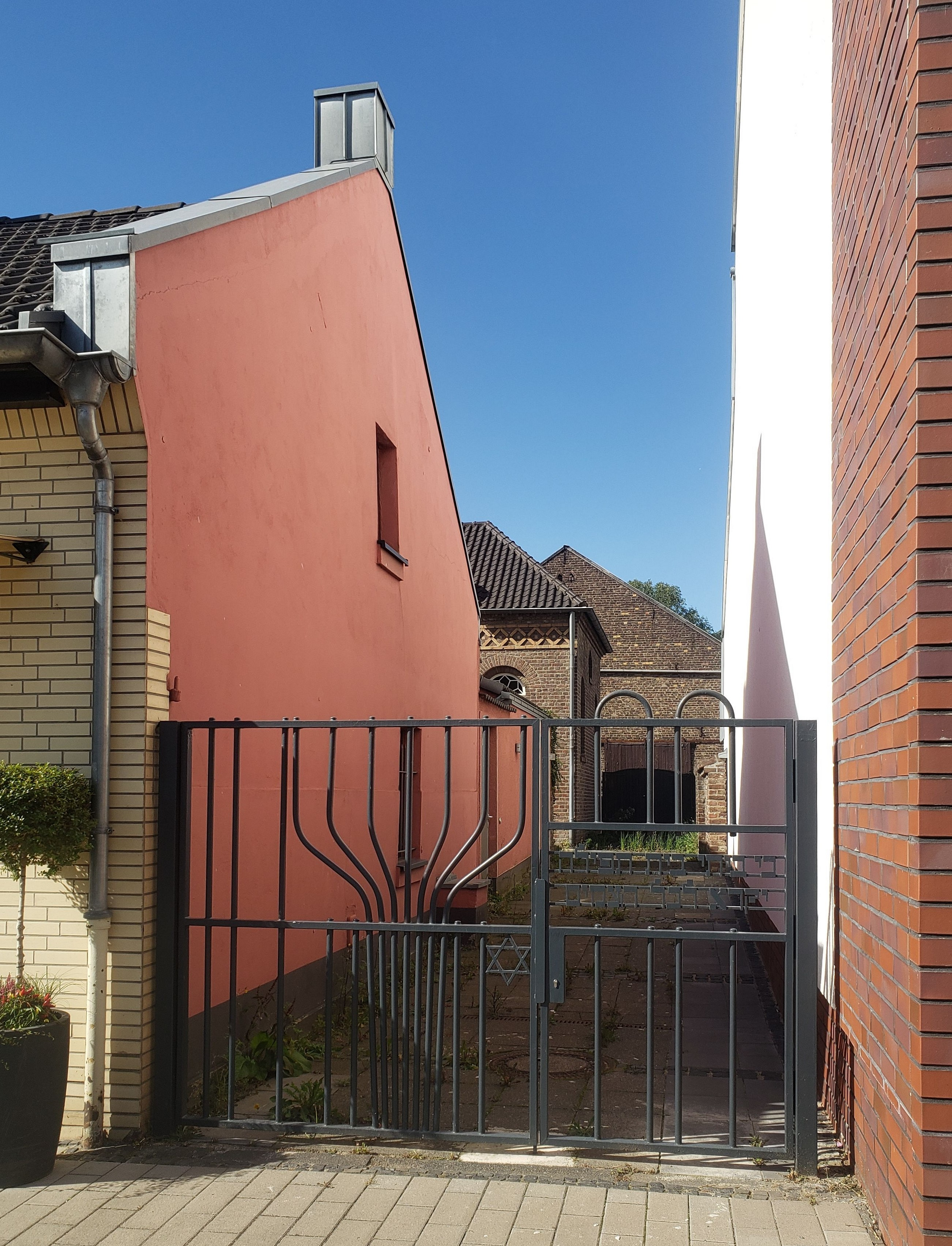
Gate to the courtyard synagogue with Star of David and stylised menorah (2022)

Stommeln Synagogue (German: Synagoge Stommeln) is a former synagogue in Stommeln, a district of Pulheim in the Rhein-Erft-Kreis, North Rhine-Westphalia, Germany. It was built in 1881–1882 and stands in a courtyard setting behind the house Hauptstraße 85. The building survived the period of National Socialism because it fell out of religious use in the early 1930s and was then sold before the November pogroms of 1938.

Since 1979 the former synagogue has been a listed monument and is used by the town as a venue for cultural events, in particular art exhibitions. As one of the few surviving synagogue buildings in the rural area around Cologne, it serves as a memorial to the Jewish community of Stommeln and to the fate of German Jews more generally.

== History ==
The Jewish community in Stommeln had a first prayer house from 1831. After its head, Moses Cahn, provided a plot of land and a sum of money, a first purpose-built synagogue was erected in 1832.Jews from nearby Sinnersdorf also attended services in Stommeln.

As the community grew – it reached its highest recorded membership of 78 persons in 1861 – a larger synagogue had to be built on the same site. This new building was ceremonially inaugurated on 11 August 1882.

In the course of the 19th and early 20th centuries many members moved to larger cities, especially Cologne, as part of broader processes of social and economic liberalisation. Around 1926 the last head of the community is thought to have moved to Cologne. By that time regular services could no longer be held, as the minimum number of ten adult Jewish men (minyan) required for public worship was no longer reached.

== Period of National Socialism ==
In 1937 the Jewish Community of Cologne (as the legal successor to the dissolved Stommeln community) sold the synagogue building to a local farmer, who used it as a storage room. The building was not destroyed during the November pogroms of 1938. In the post-war period, the synagogue fell into obscurity and only attracted public attention again in the late 1970s.

== Architecture ==
The synagogue has a floor area of about 43 m². On the west side there is a women's gallery (Frauenempore) of roughly 11 m².

The building is constructed of field-fired brick and covered by a hip roof. On the south side it presents a show façade with neo-Romanesque elements. These include a central projecting bay picked out in yellow brick, topped by a round-arched gable with a central Star of David in brickwork, three round-arched windows, and a diamond-pattern frieze beneath the eaves. Beneath the left-hand round-arched window there is a narrow, undecorated entrance door.

The Torah ark stood in the middle of the east wall, flanked by two windows and surmounted by a small three-quarter-circle window.

== Present use ==
In 1979 the municipality of Pulheim purchased the former synagogue building and had it comprehensively renovated by 1983. On 2 October 1983 it was formally opened to the public. It was initially integrated into the town’s cultural programme, hosting reflective and cultural events.

In 1984 the artist Jochen Vetter, then living in Stommeln, organised a ten-day sound and vision workshop in the building under the title Hören Sehen Staunen (“Listen See Wonder”), which was repeated in 1985.

In 1990–1991 the artist W. Gies and the then municipal director of cultural affairs, Gerhard Dornseifer, developed the exhibition project Synagoge Stommeln. Since 1991 an exhibition by one internationally recognised artist has been held there each year, engaging with the ever-present history of the site. Artists have included:

- 1991 – Jannis Kounellis
- 1992 – Richard Serra
- 1993 – Georg Baselitz
- 1994 – Mischa Kuball
- 1995 – Eduardo Chillida
- 1996 – Maria Nordman
- 1997 – Carl Andre
- 1998 – Rebecca Horn
- 1999 – Erich Reusch
- 2000 – Giuseppe Penone
- 2001 – Roman Signer
- 2002 – Lawrence Weiner
- 2003 – Rosemarie Trockel
- 2004 – Richard Long
- 2005 – Sol LeWitt
- 2006 – Santiago Sierra
- 2007 – Max Neuhaus
- 2008 – Maurizio Cattelan
- 2009 – Olaf Metzel
- 2010 – Daniel Buren
- 2014 – Gregor Schneider – Hauptstraße 85a
- 2015 – Tony Cragg
- 2016 – Walid Raad & SITU Studio – Those that are near. Those that are far.
- 2018 – Franz Erhard Walther – Two Body shapes, YELLOW
- 2019 – Alfredo Jaar – Lament of the images
- 2025 – Olaf Nicolai – An uninterpreted dream is like an unread letter

== See also ==
- Jewish cemetery (Stommeln)
