= Jewish cemetery (Stommeln) =

Jewish cemetery in North Rhine-Westphalia, Germany

Coordinates: 51.021587°N 6.760202°E

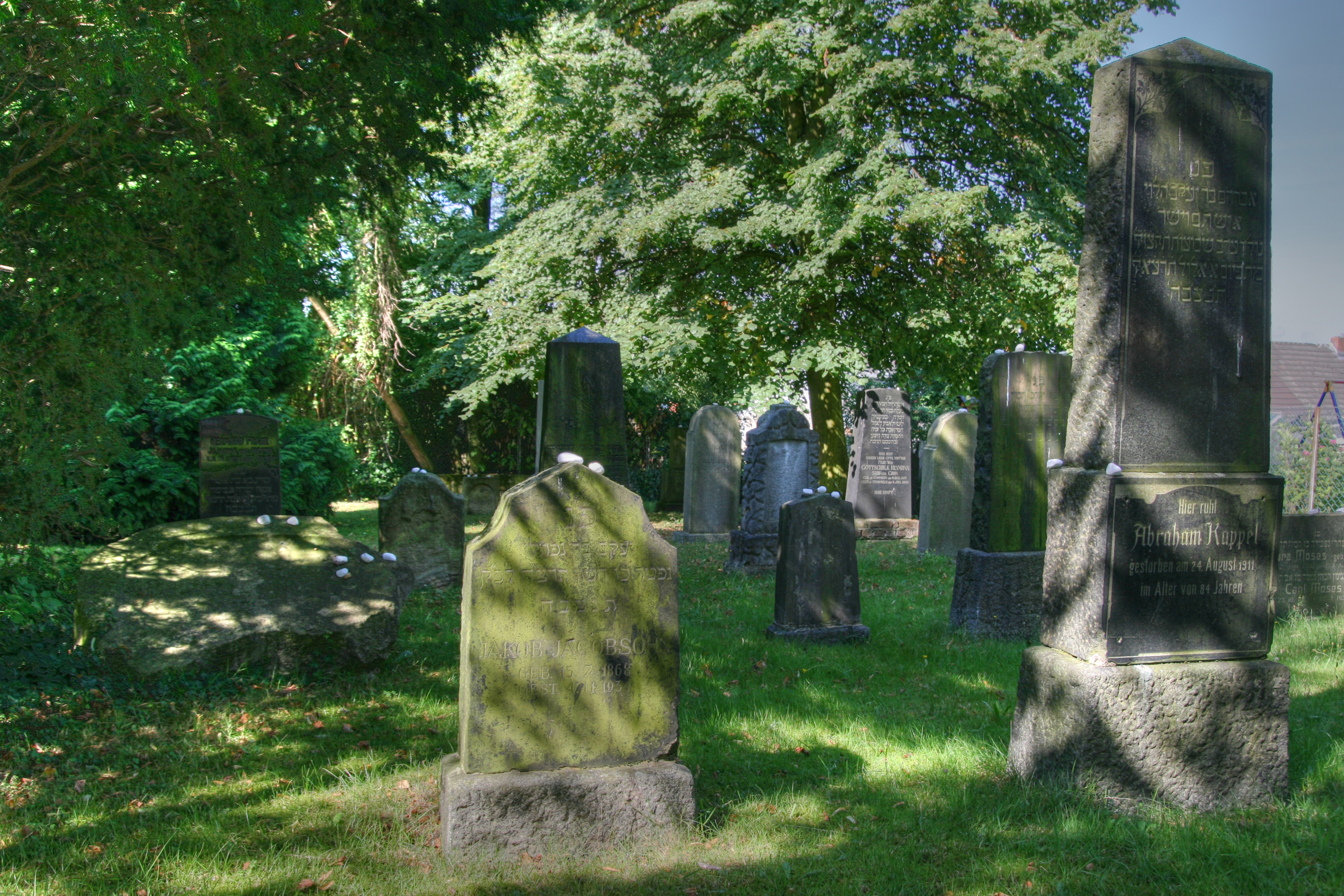
Jewish cemetery in Stommeln

The Stommeln Jewish Cemetery (German: Jüdische Friedhof Stommeln) is a Jewish cemetery in Stommeln, a district of Pulheim in the Rhein-Erft-Kreis in North Rhine-Westphalia, established before 1862. The cemetery served the Jewish Community of Stommeln. It is located on Nagelschmiedstraße.

== History ==
The small Jewish cemetery in Stommeln came into being before 1861; the exact date of its establishment is no longer known. The last burial took place in 1937. The cemetery was devastated during the Nazi era and restored to its present condition in 1967.

Today, 25 gravestones are preserved at the site.
