= Stommeln =

- Stadtteil of Pulheim
- Interactive map of Stommeln
- Location within Germany Location within North Rhine-Westphalia
- Coordinates: 51°1′11″N 6°45′35″E
- Country: Germany
- State: North Rhine-Westphalia
- Admin. region: Köln
- District: Rhein-Erft-Kreis
- Town: Pulheim

Area
  - Total: 11.89 km^{2} (4.59 sq mi)
- Elevation: 49 m (161 ft)

Population (2021)
  - Total: 8,462
  - Density: 711.7/km^{2} (1,843/sq mi)
- Time zone: UTC+01:00 (CET)
  - Summer (DST): UTC+02:00 (CEST)
- Postal codes: 50259
- Dialling codes: 02238

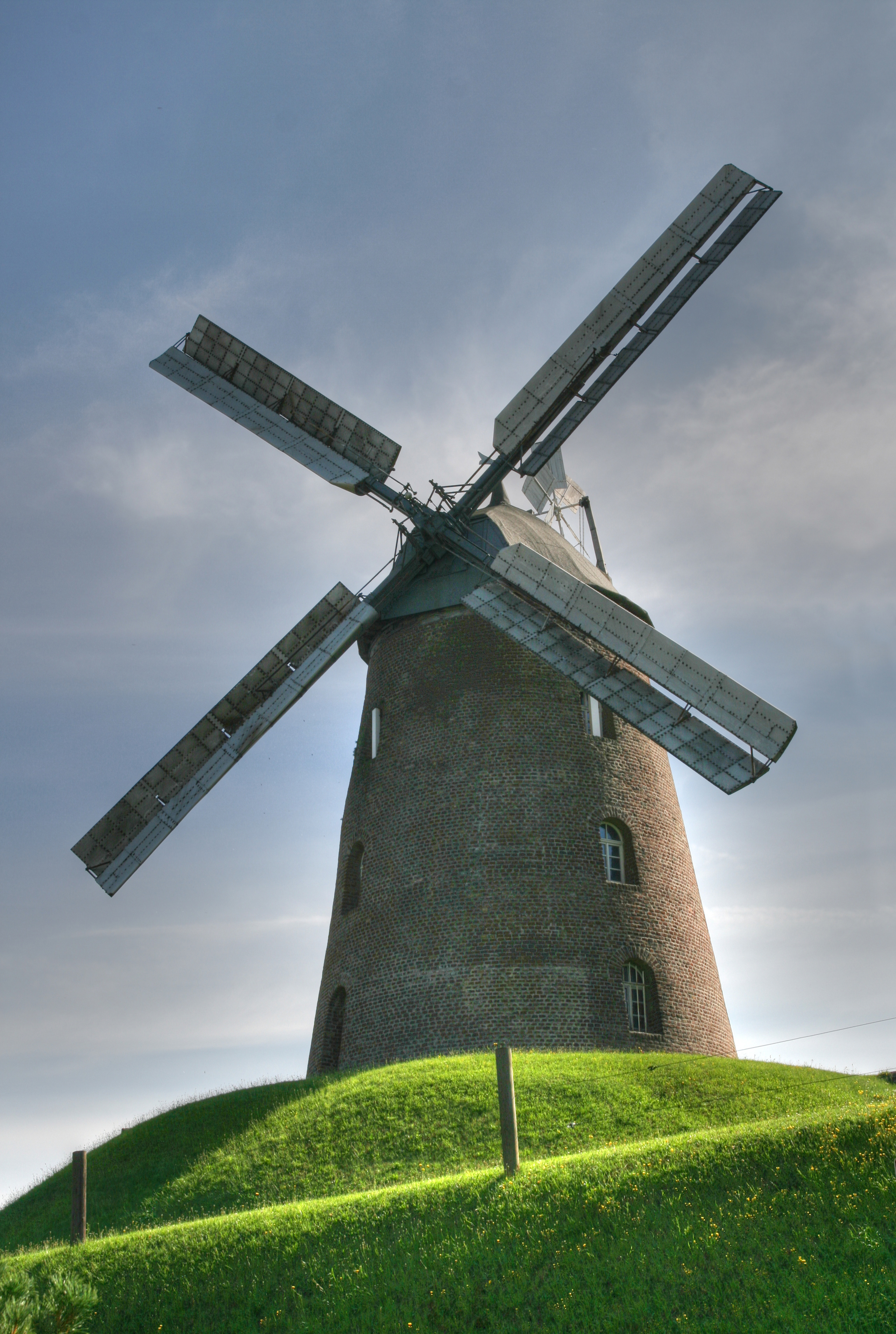
The town's landmark: a windmill

Stommeln (German pronunciation: [ˈʃtɔml̩n]) is a village (Stadtteil), part of the town of Pulheim, in North Rhine-Westphalia, Germany. It has a population of 8,462 (2021).

== Geography ==
Stommeln is situated to the north-west of Cologne. Its most recognisable feature is the old mill.

Belonging to Stommeln:
Stommelerbusch (882 residents)
Ingendorf (92 residents)

== Culture and sights ==
=== Synagogue Project Stommeln ===
The Jewish Community of Stommeln was documented in the Middle Ages; it was shattered in the 1349 Black Death pogroms, re‑established in the 18th century, grew in the 19th century, and declined until dissolving c. 1930. The last residents were deported in 1942; the Stommeln Synagogue and the local Jewish cemetery on Nagelschmiedstraße survive as memorial sites.

The Synagogue in Stommeln was built in 1882. It resisted the Nazi pogroms. Since 1991 there is an annual exhibition of an international artist.

1991 Jannis Kounellis
1992 Richard Serra
1993 Georg Baselitz
1994 Mischa Kuball
1995 Eduardo Chillida
1996 Maria Nordman
1997 Carl Andre
1998 Rebecca Horn
1999 Erich Reusch
2000 Giuseppe Penone
2001 Roman Signer
2002 Lawrence Weiner
2003 Rosemarie Trockel
2004 Richard Long
2005 Sol LeWitt
2006 Santiago Sierra
2007 Max Neuhaus
2008 Maurizio Cattelan

== Distinguished or important personage ==
- Christina von Stommeln
- Dieter Dierks
