= Jewish Community of Stommeln =

Jewish community in Stommeln, Germany

Coordinates: 51.021587°N 6.760202°E

Jewish community of Stommeln refers to the historical Jewish community in today's Pulheim district of Stommeln (Rhein-Erft District, North Rhine-Westphalia). Its presence is already documented in the Middle Ages, was violently interrupted during the Black Death pogroms in 1349, and was re-established from the early 18th century. In the 19th century the community reached its numerical peak; in the 20th century it declined sharply and effectively ceased to exist around 1930. The last Jewish residents remaining in Stommeln were deported in 1942. The Stommeln Synagogue and the Jewish cemetery on Nagelschmiedstraße have been preserved; both now serve as places of remembrance and learning.

== History ==
=== Middle Ages and early modern period ===
Jewish residents in Stommeln are documented by charters from 1305 and 1321. As a result of the Black Death pogroms, the medieval community was probably wiped out in 1349.

=== Resettlement and the 19th century ===
A renewed settlement of Jewish families is attested from the beginning of the 18th century. In 1831/1832 a prayer room or first small half-timbered synagogue was established in a rear courtyard. With the growth of the community, a new building was erected on the same site in 1881/1882 and solemnly inaugurated on 11 August 1882. The number of community members reached its peak in 1861 with 78 people; by 1890 it had fallen to 40.

=== Decline in the early 20th century ===
After the First World War there was increased migration to the cities. Around 1926 the last community leader presumably moved to Cologne; by around 1930 the community had de facto dissolved due to the lack of a minyan. For 1932/1933 around ten Jewish residents are recorded in Stommeln.

=== Nazi era and the Holocaust ===
In May 1937 the synagogue building was sold by the Cologne Synagogue Community, as legal successor, to a farmer from Stommeln and was subsequently used as a storage space; as a result, the building remained undestroyed during the November pogroms of 1938. The last Jewish residents living in Stommeln were deported in 1942; since 1988 a commemorative stele at the Jewish cemetery has borne their names.

== Community institutions ==
=== Synagogue ===
The synagogue built in 1881/1882 is set back "in the second row" behind today's address Hauptstraße 85. In 1979 the City of Pulheim acquired the derelict building; it was restored from 1981 to 1983 and opened to the public on 2 October 1983. Since 1990/1991 the former synagogue has served as the venue for an internationally noted art and remembrance project ("Synagogue Stommeln"), within which site-specific artistic interventions are realized annually.

=== Jewish cemetery ===
The Jewish cemetery on Nagelschmiedstraße was established before 1861 and was in use until 1937. Devastated during the Nazi era, it was restored in 1967. Today, 25 gravestones survive; since November 1988 a stele at the entrance has commemorated the Jewish citizens of Stommeln murdered during the Nazi period.

== Demographics ==
1861: 78 community members (peak) 1890: 40 Jewish residents 1932/1933: about 10 Jewish residents (de facto dissolution of the community around 1930)

== Commemoration ==
Since 1990/1991: "Synagogue Stommeln" project with annual site-specific interventions by international contemporary artists (including Jannis Kounellis Richard Serra Georg Baselitz Rebecca Horn Sol LeWitt Rosemarie Trockel Daniel Buren Tony Cragg Franz Erhard Walther Alfredo Jaar ). 1988: Commemorative stele at the Jewish cemetery listing the names of the murdered.

== Literature ==
- Verein für Geschichte und Heimatkunde Pulheim, ed. (1983). Juden in Stommeln. Geschichte einer jüdischen Gemeinde im Kölner Umland. Teil 1. Pulheimer Beiträge zur Geschichte und Heimatkunde. Sonderveröffentlichung (in German). Vol. 2. Pulheim: Verein für Geschichte und Heimatkunde. (ixtheo.de)
- Verein für Geschichte und Heimatkunde Pulheim, ed. (1987). Juden in Stommeln. Geschichte einer jüdischen Gemeinde im Kölner Umland. Teil 2. Pulheimer Beiträge zur Geschichte und Heimatkunde. Sonderveröffentlichung (in German). Vol. 3. Pulheim: Verein für Geschichte und Heimatkunde. ISBN 3-89125-369-9. (ixtheo.de)
- Josef Wißkirchen (1997). 200 Jahre Geschichte Stommelns. Bd. 1: 1794–1914. Pulheimer Beiträge zur Geschichte und Heimatkunde. Sonderveröffentlichung (in German). Vol. 17. Pulheim: Verein für Geschichte und Heimatkunde. (catalog.princeton.edu)
- Josef Wißkirchen (2001). 200 Jahre Geschichte Stommelns. Bd. 2: 1914–1945 (in German). Pulheim: Verein für Geschichte und Heimatkunde. (catalog.princeton.edu)
- Josef Wißkirchen (1988). Reichspogromnacht an Rhein und Erft, 9./10. November 1938. Eine Dokumentation (in German). Pulheim: Verein für Geschichte und Heimatkunde. (collections.ushmm.org)
- Josef Wißkirchen (2012). Rudy Herz. Ein jüdischer Rheinländer (in German). Weilerswist: Verlag Ralf Liebe. ISBN 978-3-941037-85-4. (verlag-ralf-liebe.de)
- Backhausen, Manfred; Schneider, Eli Josef (1983). "Die Friedhöfe der jüdischen Gemeinden in Stommeln und Fliesteden". In Verein für Geschichte und Heimatkunde Pulheim (ed.). Juden in Stommeln. Geschichte einer jüdischen Gemeinde im Kölner Umland. Teil 1 (in German). Pulheim: Verein für Geschichte und Heimatkunde. pp. 225–260. (ixtheo.de)
