= Aasee =

Aasee may refer to:

- Aasee (Münster), a lake in Germany
- Aasee (Bocholt), a lake in Germany
