= List of rowing venues =

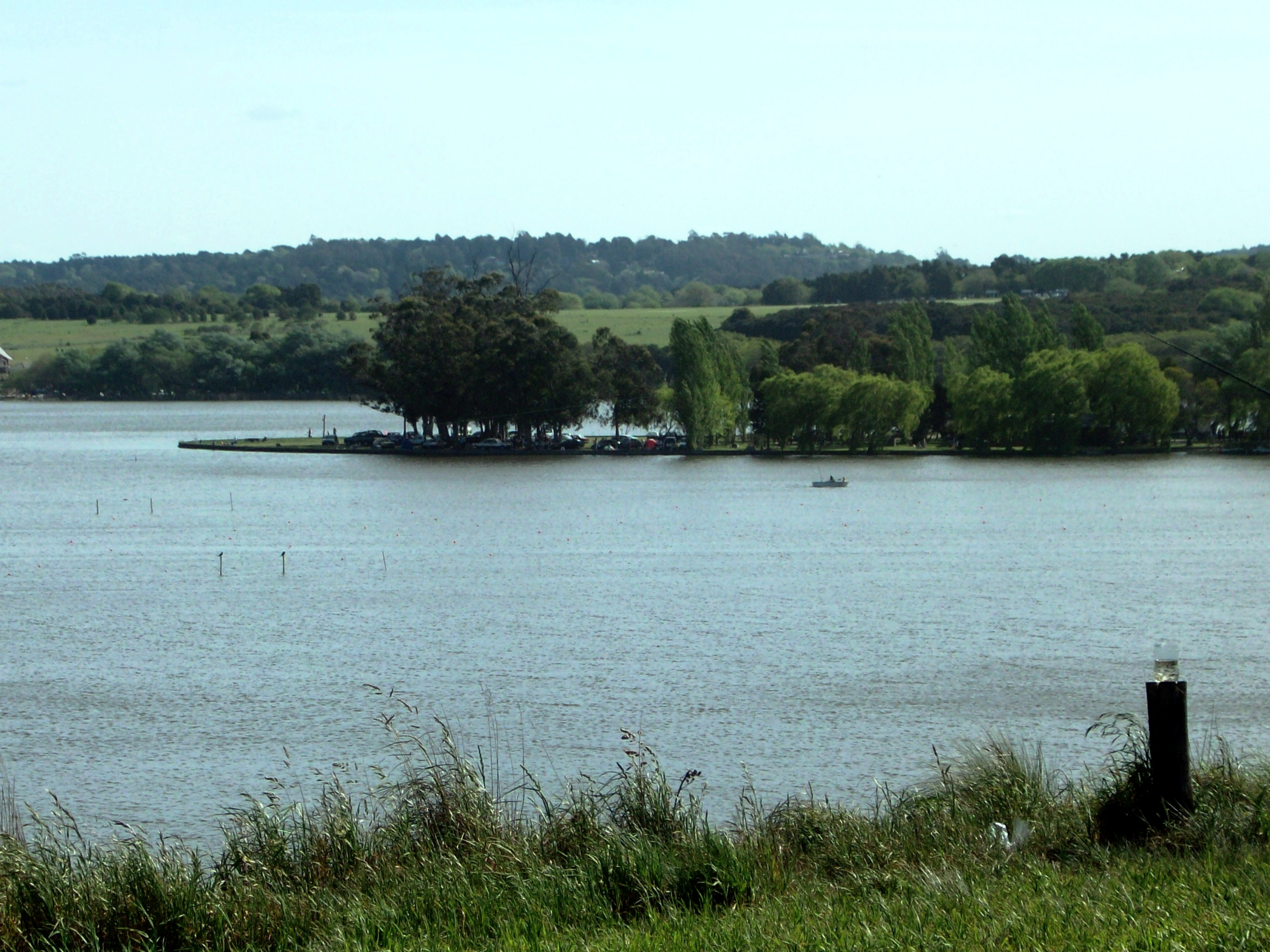
Laguna de los Padres

This list of rowing venues contains the rowing sites, that allow for international rowing regattas (2,000 m), as described by FISA. Most of these sites have hosted an Olympic or world championship regatta.

== Olympic venues ==
- (1896) Athens, Greece - Port of Piraeus, Piraeus (bad weather cancelled racing)
- (1900) Paris, France - River Seine (4 lanes)
- (1904) St. Louis, Missouri, United States - Creve Coeur Lake (overgrown – short)
- (1908) London, England, United Kingdom - Henley-on-Thames (2 lanes)
- (1912) Stockholm, Sweden - Djurgårdsbrunnsviken
- (1920) Brussels, Antwerp - Belgium Brussels-Antwerp Canal (2 lanes)
- (1924) Paris, France - River Seine (4 lanes)
- (1928) Amsterdam, Netherlands - Sloten Canal, Sloten (2 lanes)
- (1932) Los Angeles, California, United States - Long Beach Marine Stadium, Long Beach, California
- (1936) Berlin, Germany - Langer See, Grünau (6 lane FISA)
- (1948) London, England, United Kingdom - Henley-on-Thames (3 lanes)
- (1952) Helsinki, Finland - Seurasaarenselkä Bay, Meilahti
- (1956) Melbourne, Australia - Lake Wendouree, Ballarat (dry – drought)
- (1960) Rome, Italy - Lake Albano (origin of the Albano buoy system)
- (1964) Tokyo, Japan - Toda Rowing Course, Toda, Saitama (6 lane FISA)
- (1968) Mexico City, Mexico - Lake Xochimilco (6 lane FISA)
- (1972) Munich, West Germany - Regattastrecke Oberschleißheim (6 lane FISA)
- (1976) Montreal, Quebec, Canada - Montreal Rowing Basin (6 lane FISA)
- (1980) Moscow, Russian SFSR, Soviet Union - Krylatskoye Rowing Canal, Krylatskoye (8 lane FISA)
- (1984) Los Angeles, California, United States - Lake Casitas
- (1988) Seoul, South Korea - Misari Regatta (8 lane FISA)
- (1992) Barcelona, Spain - L'estany de Banyoles, Banyoles, (8 lane FISA)
- (1996) Atlanta, Georgia, United States - Lake Lanier, Gainesville, Georgia
- (2000) Sydney, Australia - Sydney International Regatta Centre (8 lane FISA)
- (2004) Athens Greece - Schinias Olympic Rowing and Canoeing Centre, Marathon (8 lane FISA)
- (2008) Beijing, China - Shunyi Olympic Rowing-Canoeing Park, Shunyi District (8 lane FISA)
- (2012) London, England, United Kingdom - Dorney Lake, Eton (8 lane FISA)
- (2016) Rio de Janeiro, Brazil - Lagoa Rodrigo de Freitas, Lagoa
- (2020) Tokyo, Japan - Sea Forest Waterway, Tokyo Bay
- (2024) Paris, France - Vaires-Sur-Marne Nautical Stadium, Vaires-sur-Marne
- (2028) Los Angeles, California, United States - Lake Perris, Perris
- (2032) Brisbane, Australia - TBD

== European venues ==
- Ada Ciganlija Belgrade, Serbia
- Allermöhe, Hamburg, Germany
- Bagsvaerd Copenhagen, Denmark
- Baldeneysee, Essen, Germany
- Beetzsee, Brandenburg, Germany
- Bosbaan, Amsterdam, Netherlands
- Brest, Belarus
- Lac du Causse, Brive-la-Gaillarde France
- Canal Olímpic de Catalunya, Castelldefels, Catalonia, Spain
- Centro Sportivo Remiero della Marina Militare, Sabaudia, Italy
- Elfrather See, Krefeld, Germany
- Fühlingen, Cologne, Germany
- Gravelines, France
- Hazewinkel (Bloso Sports Center), Belgium
- (United Kingdom) Holme Pierrepont National Watersports Centre, Nottingham, England
- Idroscalo, Milan, Italy
- Arungen, Oslo, Norway
- Ioannina, Greece
- Kaukajärvi, Tampere, Finland
- Klagenfurt, Austria
- Kruszwica, Poland
- Lac d'Aiguebelette, Aiguebelette, France
- Lake Bled, Bled, Slovenia
- Lake Jarun, Zagreb, Croatia
- La Cartuja, Guadalquivir, Seville, Spain
- Lake Malta, Poznań, Poland
- (United Kingdom) London Regatta Centre, London, England
- Minsk, Belarus
- Montemor-o-Velho, Portugal
- Ottensheim, Austria
- Piediluco, Italy
- Plovdiv, Bulgaria
- Račice, Roudnice, Czech Republic
- (United Kingdom) Redgrave Pinsent Rowing Lake, Caversham, England
- Rotsee, Lucerne, Switzerland
- (United Kingdom) Strathclyde Country Park, Motherwell, Scotland
- Szegedi Olimpiai Központ, Szeged, Hungary
- Trakai, Lithuania
- Vaires-sur-Marne, France
- Varese, Italy
- Vienna, Austria
- Wedau, Duisburg, Germany
- Willem-Alexander Baan, Rotterdam, Netherlands

== North American venues ==
- Nathan Benderson Park, Sarasota, United States (Class C, Wind, Heat)
- Eagle Creek Park, Indianapolis, United States
- Oklahoma River, Oklahoma City, United States (Class C, Wind, Heat)
- Mercer Lake, West Windsor, New Jersey United States
- Royal Canadian Henley Rowing Course, St. Catharines, Canada (8 lane FISA Class A)

== Asian venues ==
- Jakabaring Lake, Palembang, Indonesia
- Manggar Reservoir, Balikpapan, Indonesia
- Nagaragawa International Regatta Course, Gifu Prefecture, Japan
- Samarkand Rowing Canal, Samarkand, Uzbekistan
- Sha Tin Rowing Centre, Sha Tin, Hong Kong
- Shanghai Water Sports Centre, Dianshan Lake, Shanghai, China
- Situ Cipule, Karawang Regency, Indonesia
- Yarkon River, Tel Aviv, Israel
- Youtefa Bay, Jayapura, Indonesia

== Oceania venues ==
- Champion Lakes, Perth Western Australia, Australia
- Lake Barrington Tasmania, Australia
- Sydney International Regatta Centre New South Wales, Australia
- Lake Karapiro, Hamilton, New Zealand

== South American venues ==
- Laguna de los Padres, Mar del Plata, Argentina
- Lago Paranoá, Brasília, Brazil
- Laguna Grande, San Pedro de la Paz, Chile
