= Erdfallsee =

Lake in Hopsten, Germany

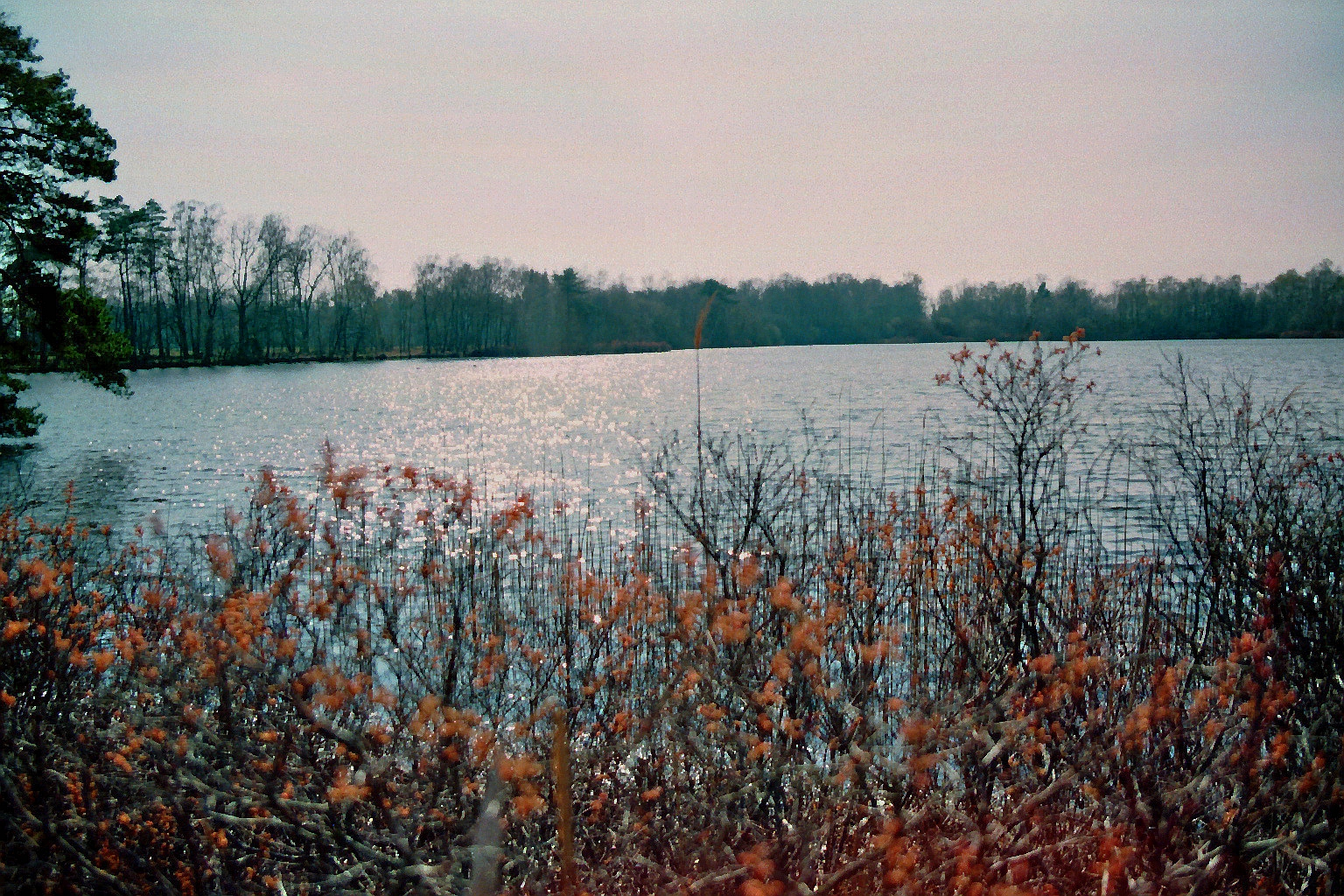

- Location within North Rhine-Westphalia
- Location: Hopsten, Kreis Steinfurt, North Rhine-Westphalia
- Coordinates: 52°20′57″N 7°37′29″E
- Primary inflows: none
- Primary outflows: none
- Basin countries: Germany
- Max. length: 320 m (1,050 ft)
- Max. width: 120–140 m (390–460 ft)
- Surface area: 7 ha (17 acres)
- Max. depth: 12 m (39 ft)
- Surface elevation: 44 m (144 ft)

Erdfallsee is a lake in Hopsten, Kreis Steinfurt, North Rhine-Westphalia, Germany. At an elevation of 44 m, its surface area is 7 ha (17 acres).
