= Heideweiher =

Lake in Hopsten, North Rhine-Westphalia, Germany

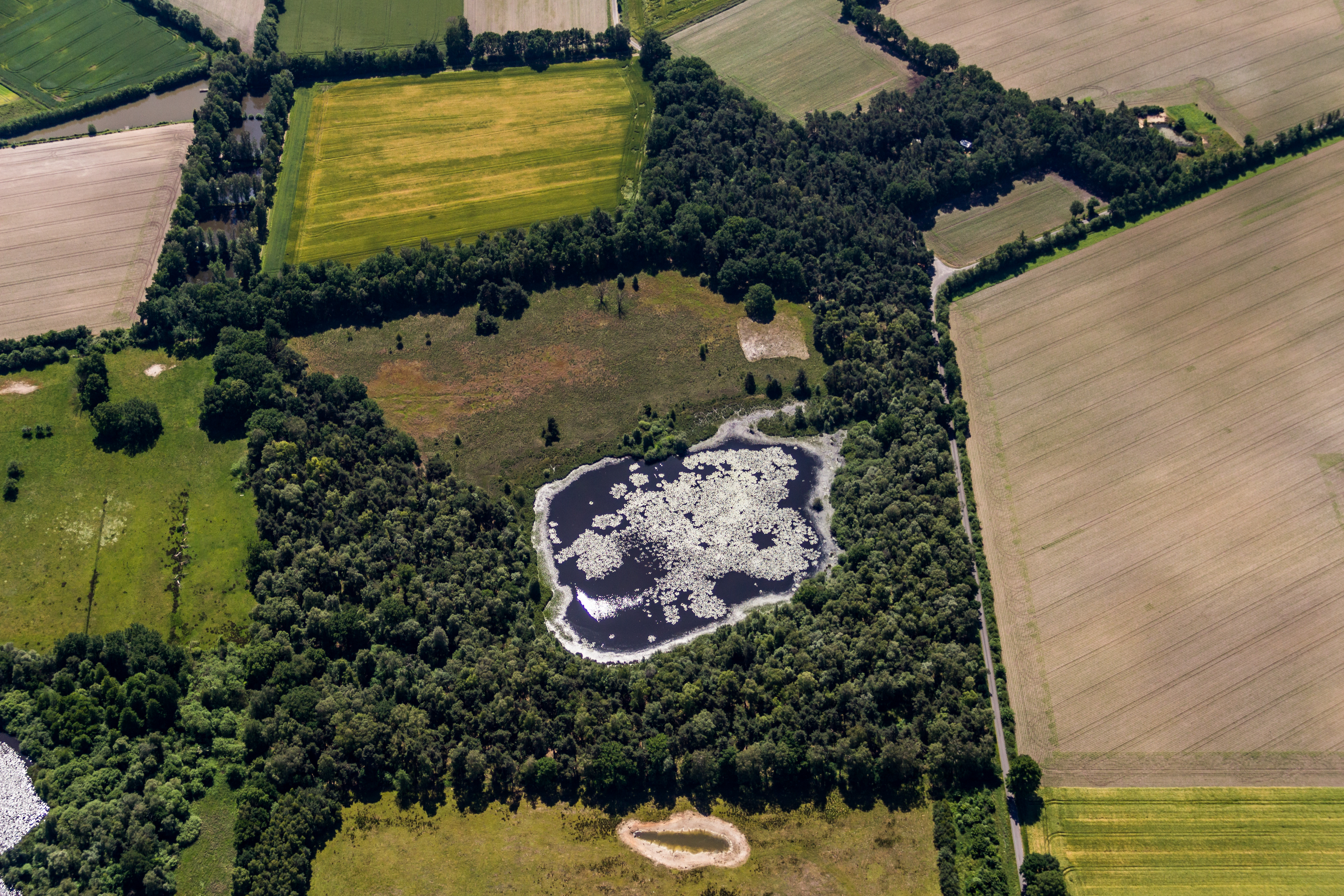

- Location within North Rhine-Westphalia
- Location: Hopsten, Kreis Steinfurt, North Rhine-Westphalia
- Coordinates: 52°20′45″N 7°37′14″E
- Primary inflows: none
- Primary outflows: none
- Basin countries: Germany
- Max. length: 135 metres (443 ft)
- Max. width: 110 metres (360 ft)
- Surface area: 2 ha (4.9 acres)
- Max. depth: 1.4 m (4 ft 7 in)
- Surface elevation: 45 m (148 ft)

Heideweiher is a lake in Hopsten, Kreis Steinfurt, North Rhine-Westphalia, Germany. At an elevation of 45 m, its surface area is 2 ha. The lake is protected as a nature reserve.
