= Großes Heiliges Meer =

Lake in North Rhine-Westphalia, Germany

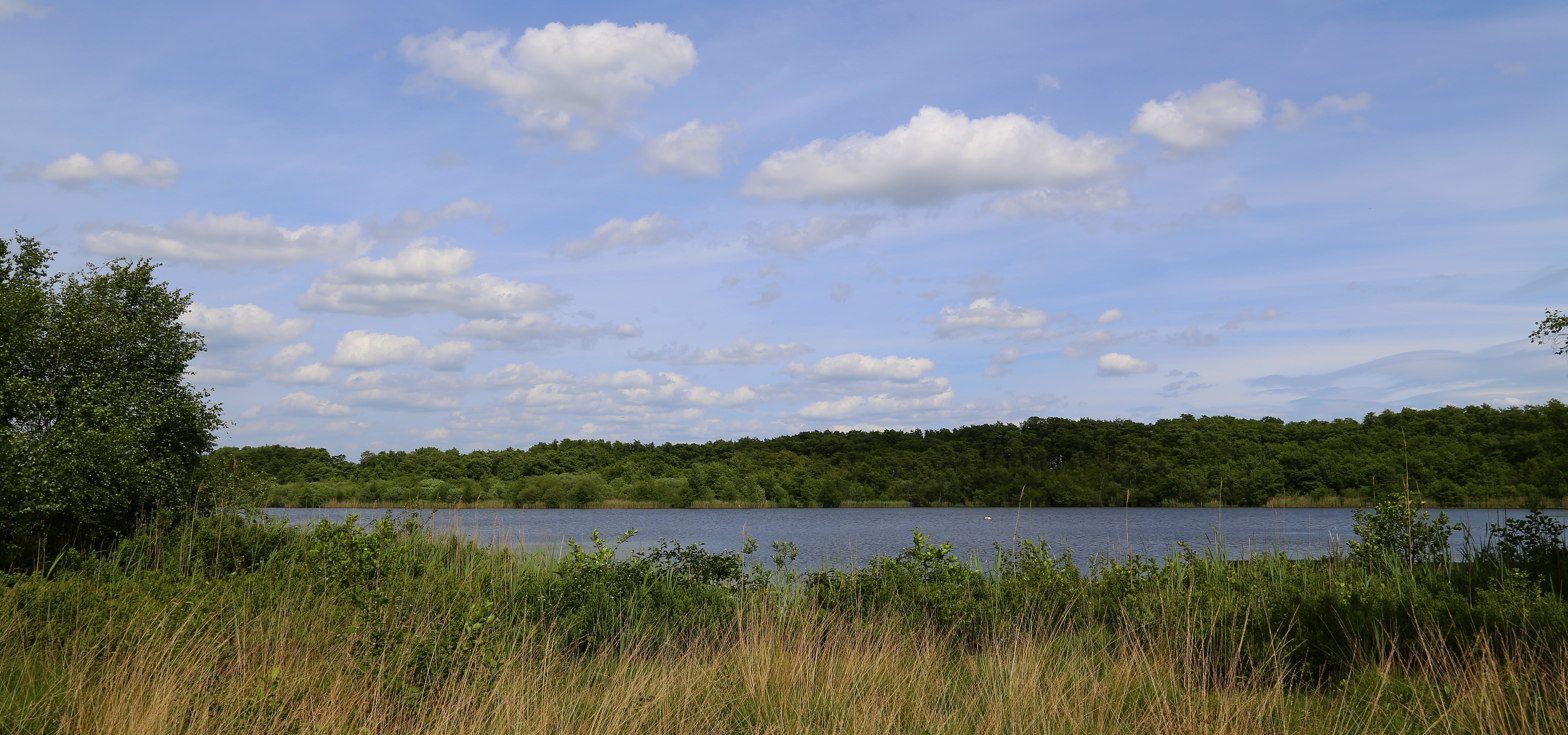
- Grosses Heiliges Meer 09

- Location within North Rhine-Westphalia
- Location: Hopsten, Kreis Steinfurt, North Rhine-Westphalia
- Coordinates: 52°21′07″N 7°38′01″E
- Basin countries: Germany
- Max. length: 320 m (1,050 ft)
- Max. width: 120–140 m (390–460 ft)
- Surface area: 11 ha (27 acres)
- Max. depth: 10.7 m (35 ft)
- Surface elevation: 425 m (1,394 ft)

Großes Heiliges Meer is a lake in Hopsten, Kreis Steinfurt, North Rhine-Westphalia, Germany. At an elevation of 42,5 m, its surface area is 11 ha.
