= Offlumer See =

- Location within North Rhine-Westphalia
- Location: Kreis Steinfurt, North Rhine-Westphalia
- Coordinates: 52°14′11.67″N 7°20′43.10″E
- Type: artificial lake
- Basin countries: Germany
- Surface area: 0.5 km^{2} (0.19 sq mi)
- Max. depth: 30 m (98 ft)
- Surface elevation: 46 m (151 ft)

Offlumer See is a lake in the town of Neuenkirchen district Kreis Steinfurt, North Rhine-Westphalia, Germany. At an elevation of 46 m, its surface area is 0.5 km².
