= Bleibtreusee =

Lake in Rhein-Erft-Kreis, Germany

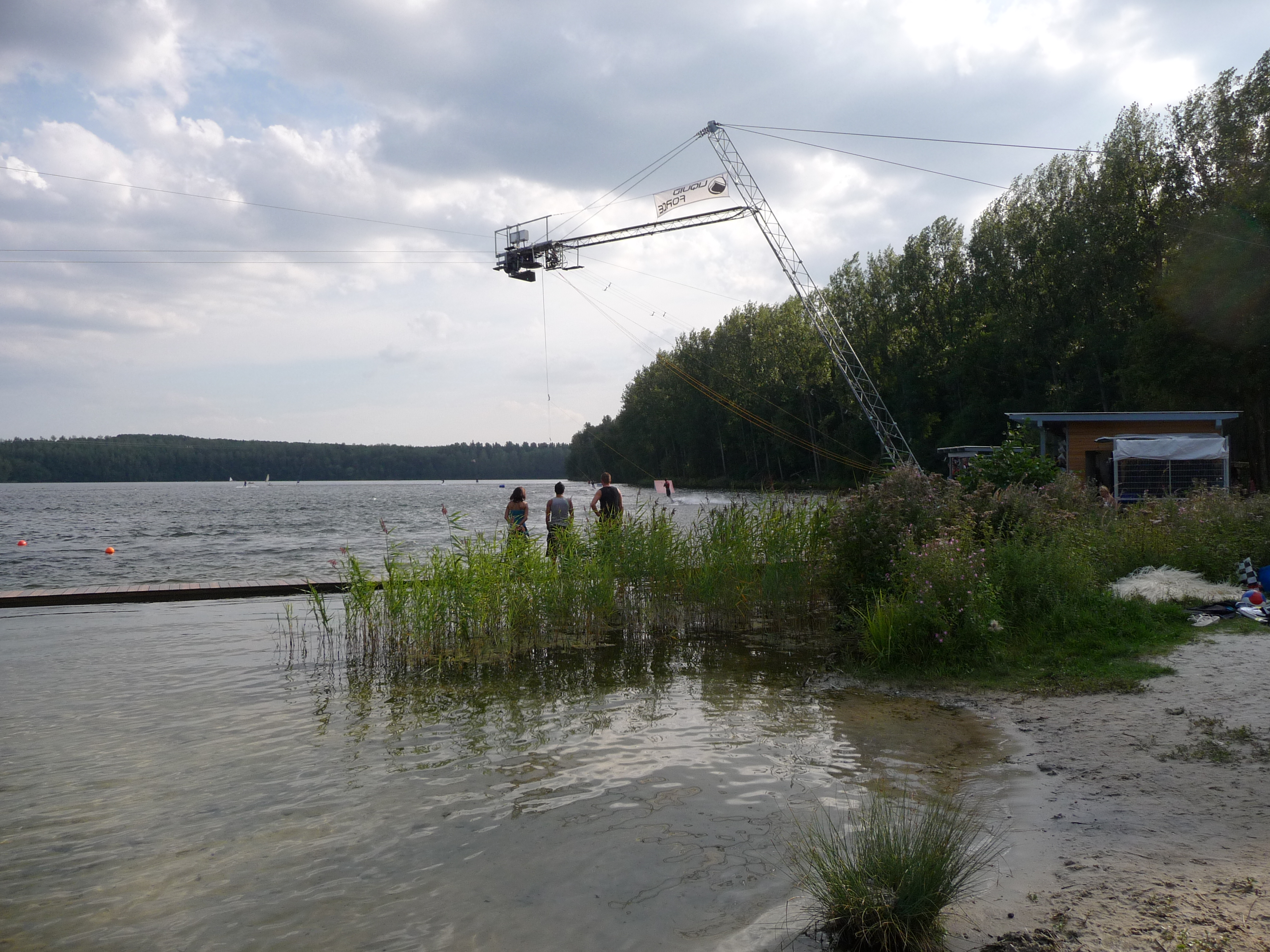

- Location within North Rhine-Westphalia
- Location: Rhein-Erft-Kreis, North Rhine-Westphalia
- Coordinates: 50°50′23″N 06°51′35″E
- Basin countries: Germany
- Surface area: 74.2 ha (183 acres)

Bleibtreusee is an artificial lake on the grounds of the former open-pit lignite mine in Rhein-Erft-Kreis, North Rhine-Westphalia, Germany. At an elevation of its surface area is 74.2 ha. North of Bleibtreusee, there is an electricity pylon, which carried from 1977 to 2010 an observation deck.

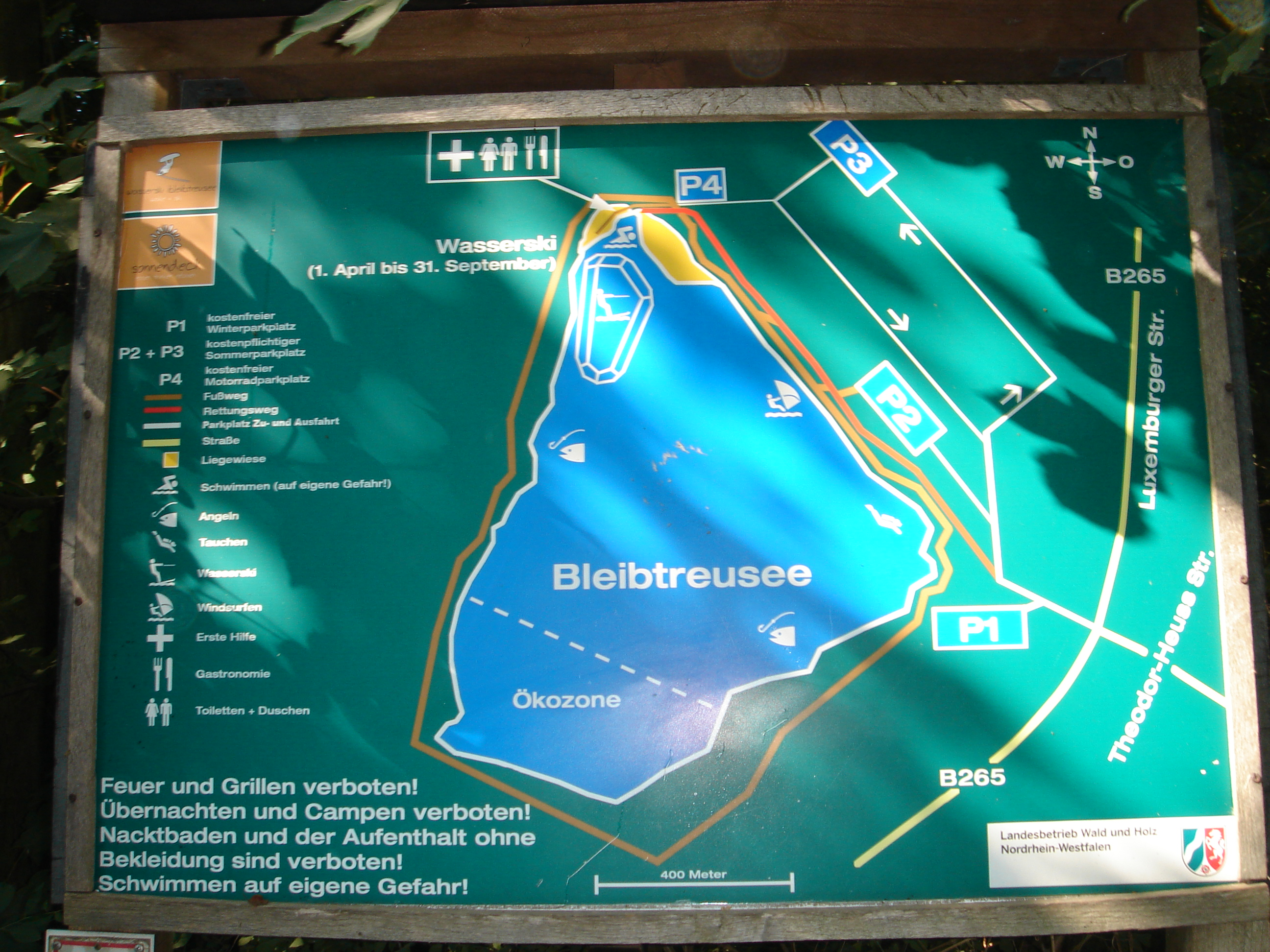
General Plan (2013-07-21)
