= Oberlübber Bergsee =

Lake in Germany

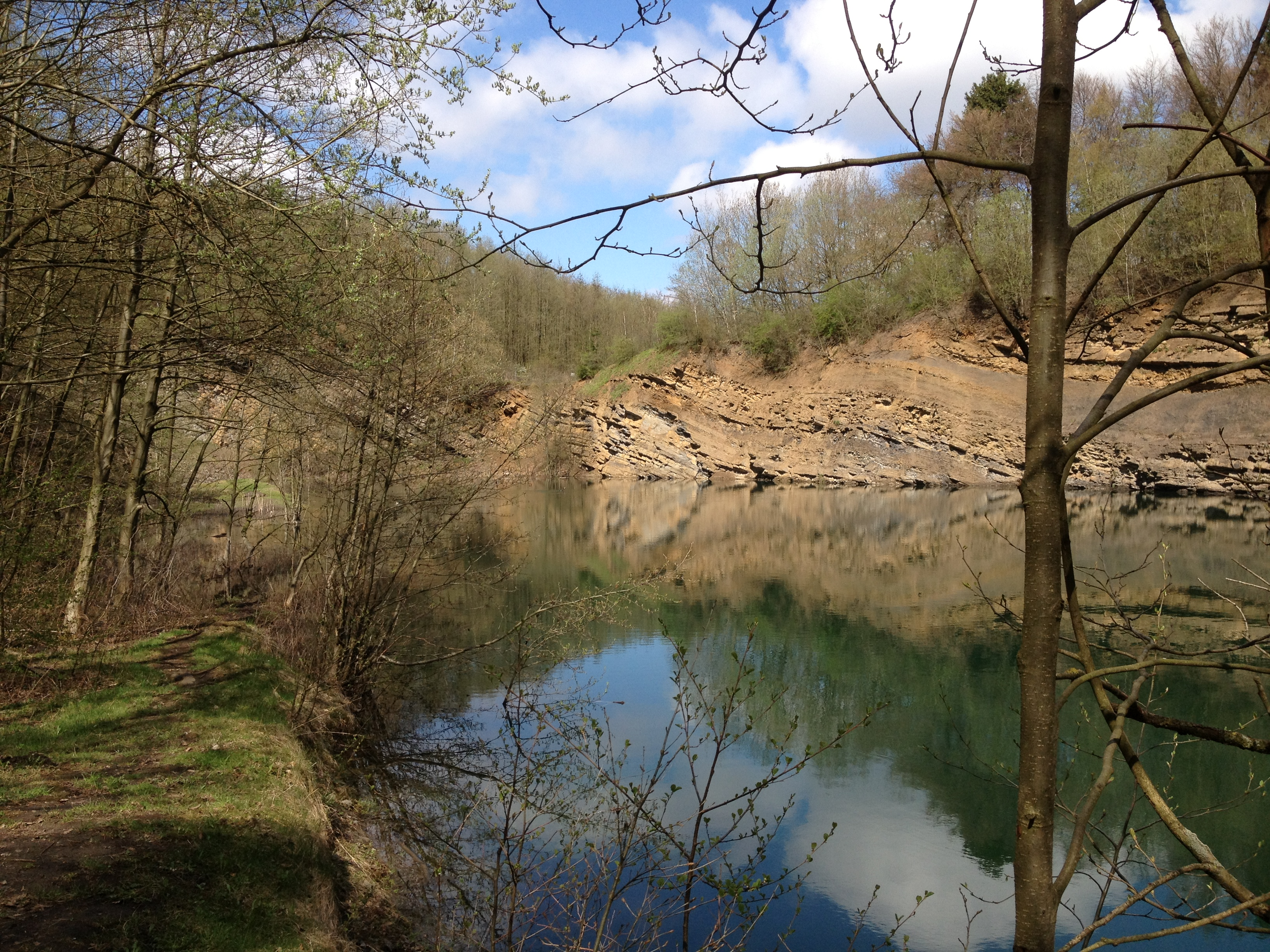

- Location within North Rhine-Westphalia
- Location: Kreis Minden-Lübbecke, North Rhine-Westphalia
- Coordinates: 52°17′8″N 8°43′44″E
- Basin countries: Germany
- Max. length: 167 m (548 ft)
- Max. width: 50 m (160 ft)
- Surface area: ca. 0.8 ha (2.0 acres)
- Shore length^{1}: 0.4 km (0.25 mi)
- Surface elevation: 200 m (660 ft)
- ^{1} Shore length is not a well-defined measure.

Oberlübber Bergsee is a lake in Kreis Minden-Lübbecke, North Rhine-Westphalia, Germany. At an elevation of 200 m, its surface area is ca. 0.8 ha.
