= Hiltruper See =

Lake in North Rhine-Westphalia, Germany

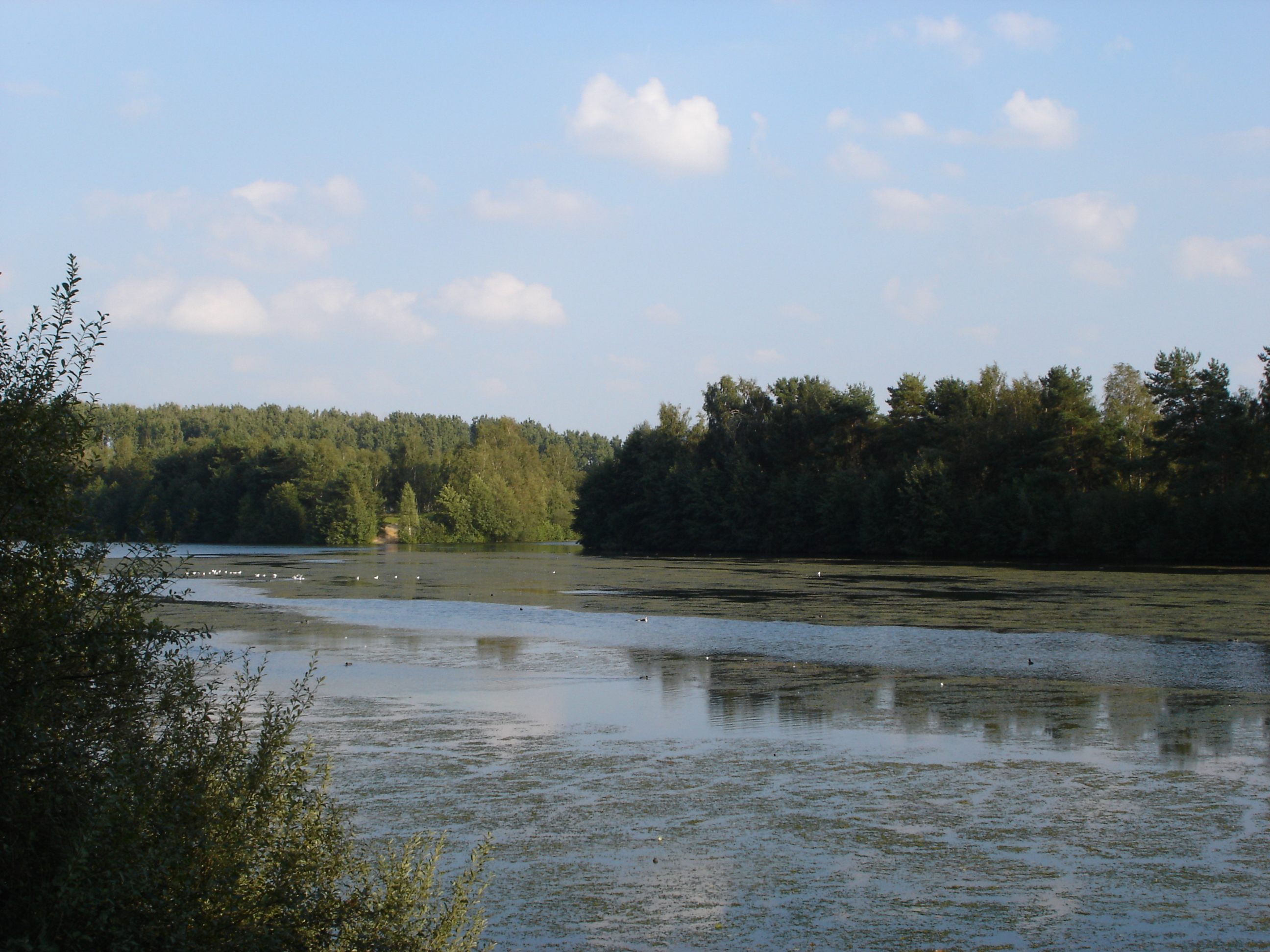

- Location within North Rhine-Westphalia
- Location: Münsterland, North Rhine-Westphalia
- Coordinates: 51°53′14″N 7°39′30″E
- Basin countries: Germany
- Max. length: 400 m (1,300 ft)
- Max. width: 520 m (1,710 ft)
- Surface area: 15.8 ha (39 acres)
- Max. depth: 4.5 m (15 ft)
- Surface elevation: 58 m (190 ft)

Hiltruper See is a lake in Münsterland, North Rhine-Westphalia, Germany. At an elevation of 58 m, its surface area is 15.8 ha.
