= Gittruper See =

Lake in Münster, Germany

- Location within North Rhine-Westphalia
- Location: Münsterland, North Rhine-Westphalia
- Coordinates: 52°02′40″N 7°39′50″E
- Basin countries: Germany
- Max. length: 300 m (980 ft)
- Max. width: 225 m (738 ft)
- Max. depth: 11 m (36 ft)
- Surface elevation: 40 m (130 ft)

Gittruper See is a lake in Münsterland, North Rhine-Westphalia, Germany. At an elevation of 40 m, its surface area is.
