= Lucherberger See =

Former lake in Inden, North Rhine-Westphalia, Germany

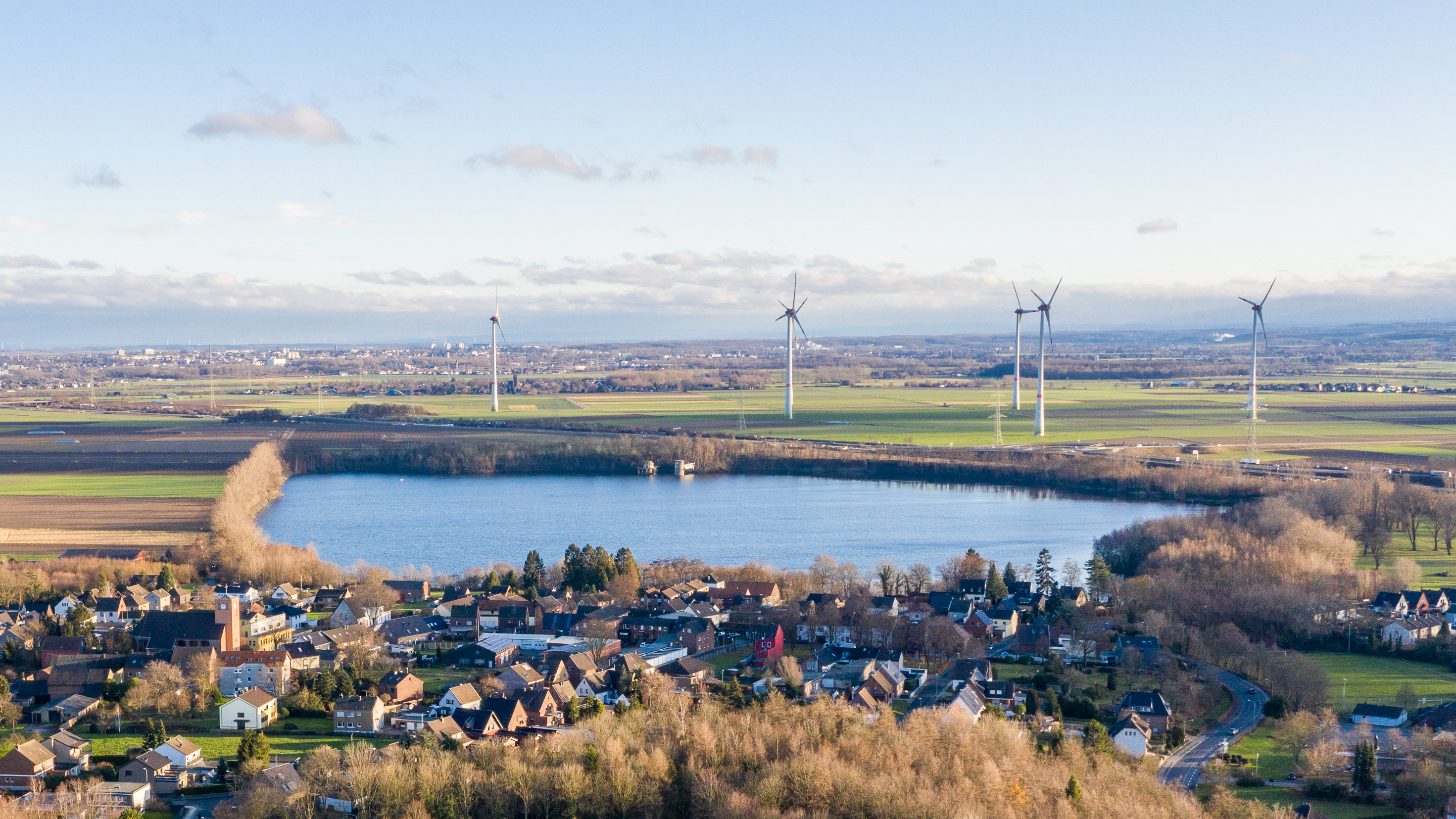

- Location within North Rhine-Westphalia
- Location: Inden, Kreis Düren, North Rhine-Westphalia
- Coordinates: 50.840934°N 6.380954°E
- Basin countries: Germany
- Surface area: 56 ha (140 acres)
- Max. depth: 30 m (98 ft)

Lucherberger See is a former lake in Inden, Kreis Düren, North Rhine-Westphalia, Germany. Its surface area was 56 ha and its depth was about 14 meters. The lake was fed with water from the Rur. Starting in 2021, the lake was drained for the expansion of the Inden surface mine. The draining was completed in 2024. For the future, after mining in the area will have ended, a new artificial lake called Indescher See is planned in the region, with filling of the lake starting in 2030 and completion around the year 2060.
