= Sandruper See =

Body of water in North Rhine-Westphalia, Germany

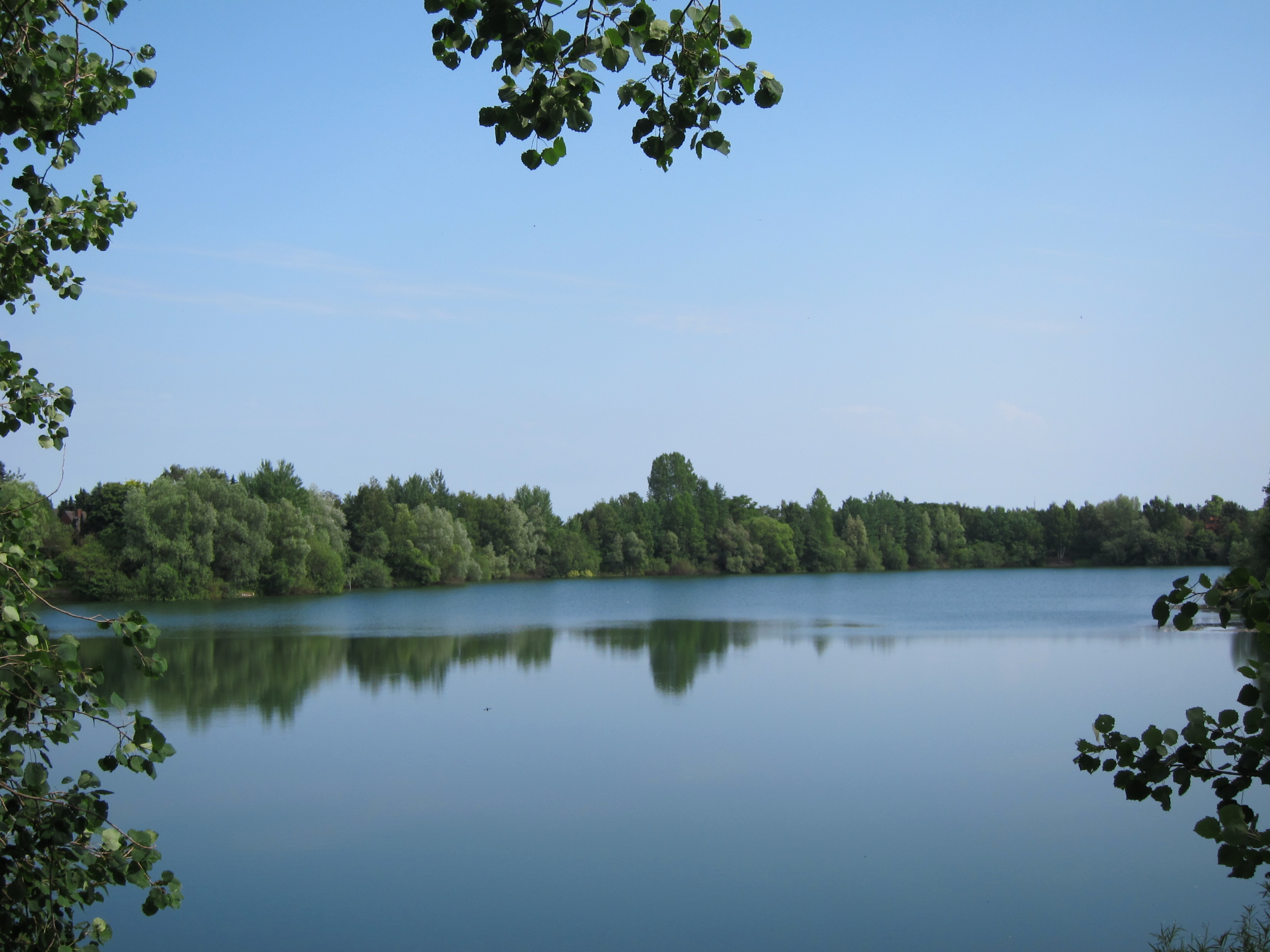

- Location within North Rhine-Westphalia
- Location: Münsterland, North Rhine-Westphalia
- Coordinates: 52°01′35″N 7°36′56″E
- Basin countries: Germany
- Max. length: 550 m (1,800 ft)
- Max. width: 300 m (980 ft)
- Surface area: 11 ha (27 acres)
- Max. depth: 19.5 m (64 ft)
- Surface elevation: 43 m (141 ft)

Sandruper See is a lake in Münsterland, North Rhine-Westphalia, Germany. At an elevation of 43 m, its surface area is 11 ha. It is immediately south of the small town of Sprakel, itself a northern suburb of the city of Münster.

Since 1966, the lake has been managed by the local angling club, VFG Frühauf Münster, who own half the lake.
