= Torfmoorsee =

Lake in Germany

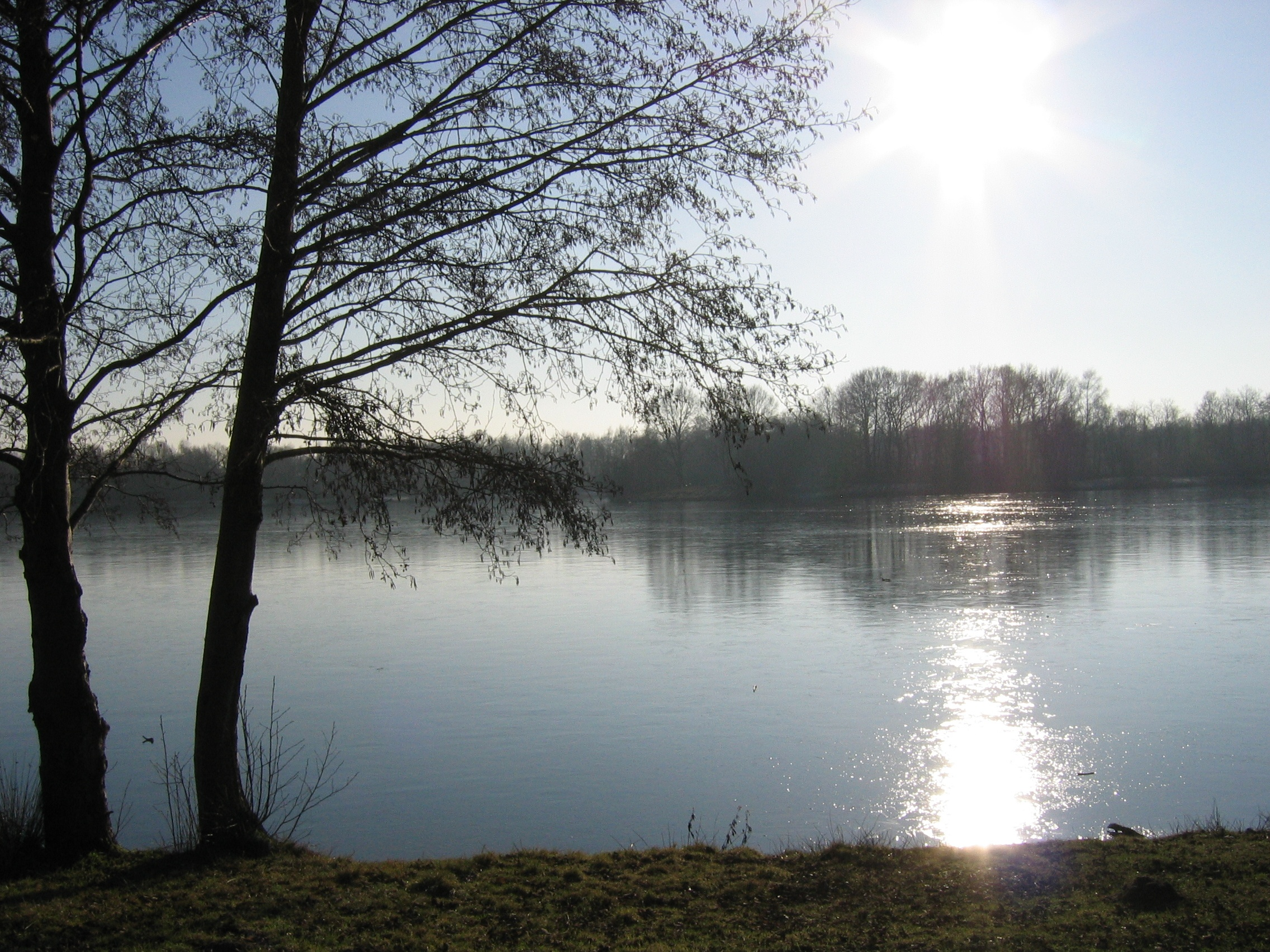
- Torfmoorsee in winter

- Location within North Rhine-Westphalia
- Location: North Rhine-Westphalia
- Coordinates: 52°17′02″N 7°33′50″E
- Type: Quarry lake
- Basin countries: Germany
- Max. length: 800 m (2,600 ft)
- Max. width: 600 m (2,000 ft)
- Surface area: 24 ha (0.24 km^{2})
- Max. depth: 20 m (66 ft)
- Settlements: Hörstel, Bevergern

Torfmoorsee is a lake in North Rhine-Westphalia, Germany. It is a roughly 24-hectare former quarry lake in the territory of the city of Hörstel in the Tecklenburger Land region. It lies in the middle of the 57-hectare Torfmoor local recreation area.

== History ==
The lake came into being between the late 1970s and the early 1980s, and owes its origin to the construction of the section of the A30 autobahn between Rheine and Ibbenbüren. The excavated sand was used to build the autobahn, creating a lake 800 m long and 600 m wide with a depth of up to 20 m.

In 1985, as part of the further development of the recreation area, a bathing bay of about one hectare with a sandy beach and a lawn was created. With the exception of a fish-spawning zone, swimming is permitted in the remaining part of the lake as well.

== Features ==
In the immediate vicinity, an inaccessible wetland biotope was laid out in 1980, and an area of 70,000 square metres around the lake was forested. The lake itself is surrounded by a circular walking trail about 2.5 kilometres long, coupled with a forest trail and a geological nature trail. The latter displays 23 rocks, each accompanied by information boards describing their origin and history.

The lake is home to a local sailing community, which regularly holds inter-regional surfing and sailing competitions there. Another sporting event at the Torfmoorsee has been an annual triathlon held since 1985.

The lake's operations building contains a small kiosk, public toilets, and the watch stations of the local DLRG (lifesaving association) and DRK (Red Cross) chapters, which are staffed from April to October. Several water-sports clubs are based at the lake; the Seglergemeinschaft Hörstel 1978 uses it for sailing and windsurfing. In summer, the Torfmoorsee serves as a bathing lake for the surrounding population, and it is also accessible to divers.

=== Geological nature trail ===
A geological nature trail was established at the Torfmoorsee in 1981. Alongside numerous types of rock, it displays a coal plough from the Ibbenbüren Coal Mine set in front of an artificial coal face. The shield supports, which had been missing for many years from the reconstructed coal-mining display, were added in October 2001 by a working group.
