= Aasee (Bocholt) =

Lake in North Rhine-Westphalia, Germany

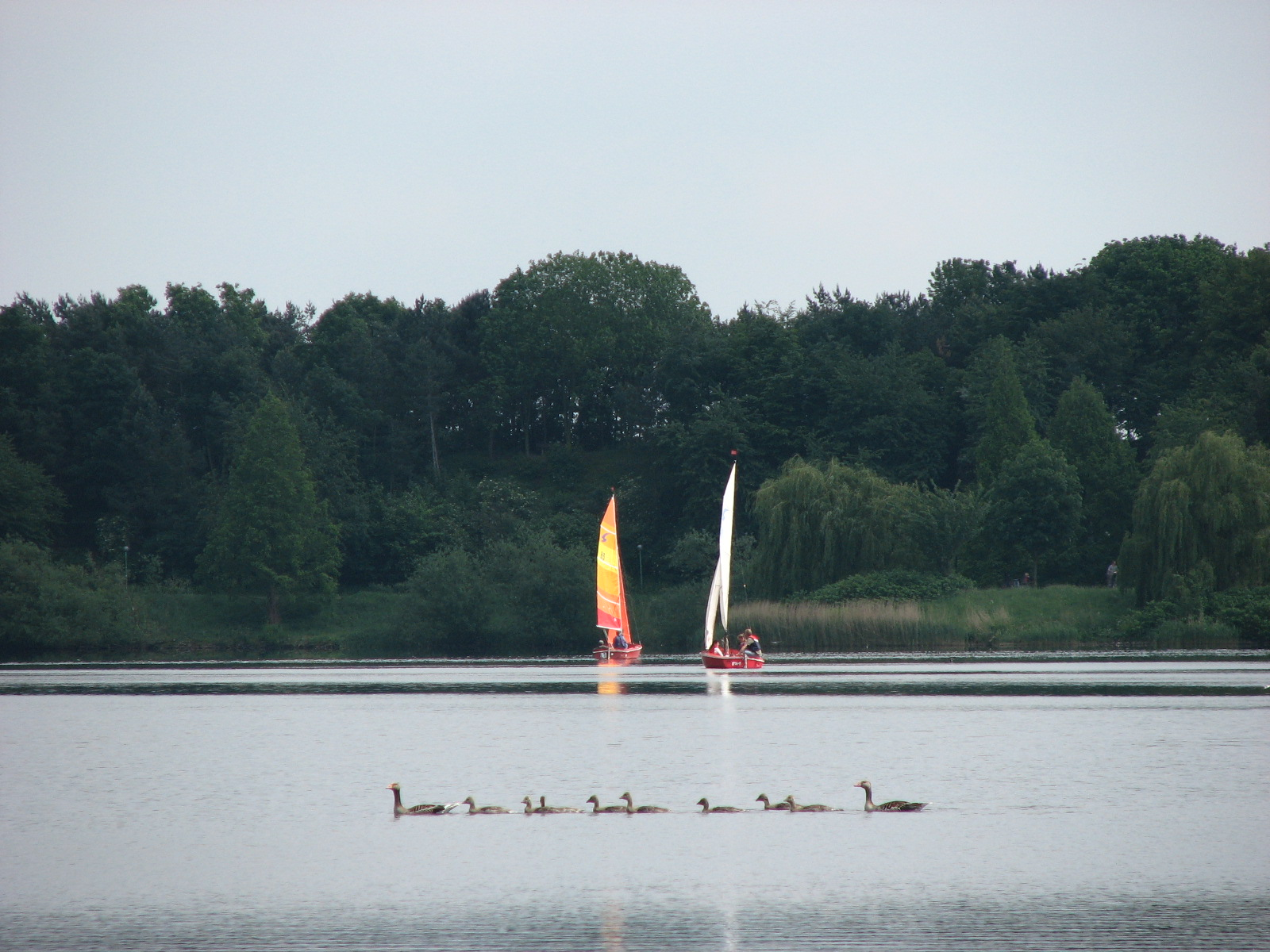

- Location within Germany
- Location: Bocholt, Kreis Borken, North Rhine-Westphalia
- Coordinates: 51°49′47″N 6°38′8″E
- Primary inflows: Pleystrang
- Primary outflows: Bocholter Aa
- Basin countries: Germany
- Surface area: 0.32 km^{2} (0.12 sq mi)
- Max. depth: ca. 6 m (20 ft)
- Water volume: 1,400,000 km^{3} (340,000 cu mi)
- Surface elevation: 23.8 m (78 ft)

Aasee is an artificial lake in Bocholt, Kreis Borken, North Rhine-Westphalia, Germany. At an elevation of 23.8 meters, its surface area is 0.32 km^{2}. It serves as a local recreation area which has a total area of around 0.74 km^{2}. It also serves as flood protection for the surrounding area.

== Recreation, athletics and culture ==
There are numerous athletic and recreation activity possibilities on and around Aasee. For example, it is possible to sail and surf. There is also an outdoor swimming area monitored by the German Life Saving Association as well as the Strandcafé Ottilie on the southeastern shore. Along the western shore is an area approved for model ships. Since 1987, the Aasee-Triathlon has taken place every year in June. The areas around the Aasee are used for numerous public events and gatherings.

Separated from the Aasee by just one street, the Bocholt textile museum's building is modeled on a Weaving mill from the 19th century.

== History ==
Beginning in the 1970s, the Aasee was created by dredging. The project was eventually completed in 1987. The extensive area previously served as a flood plain.

The Bocholter Aa was led south around the lake, to compensate for the level of the Aasee. Locks regulate both the inflow and outflow of water. At one of the locks are the remains of the "Königsmühle" (King's Mill), whose walls date from the Late Middle Ages.

A small nature reserve for water fowl with artificial nesting holes has been created.

== See also ==
- List of lakes of North Rhine-Westphalia
