= Adolfosee =

Lake in Germany

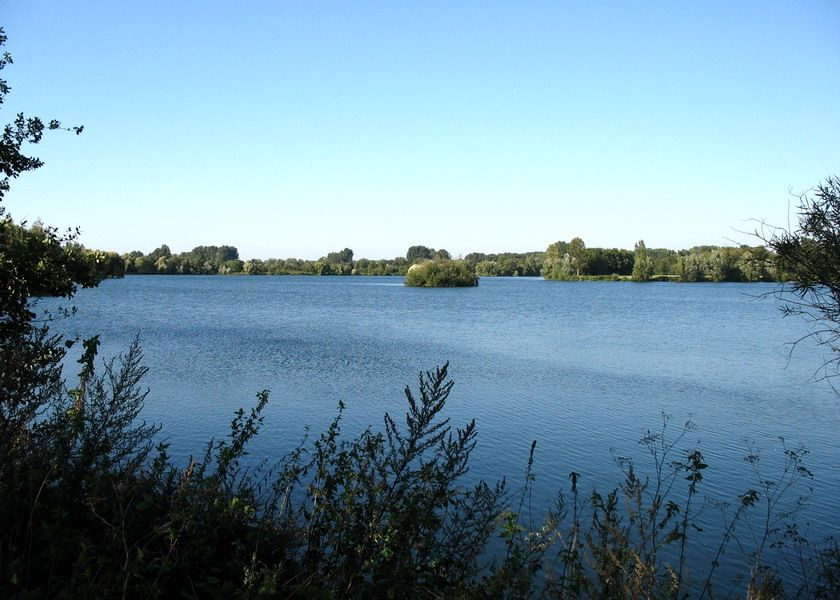

- Location within North Rhine-Westphalia
- Location: North Rhine-Westphalia
- Coordinates: 51°03′35″N 06°10′12″E
- Basin countries: Germany
- Surface area: 0.307 km^{2} (0.119 sq mi)
- Max. depth: 12 m (39 ft)
- Surface elevation: 39 m (128 ft)

Adolfosee is a lake in North Rhine-Westphalia, Germany. At an elevation of 39 m, its surface area is 0.307 km².
