= Elfrather See =

Artificial lake in Krefeld, Germany

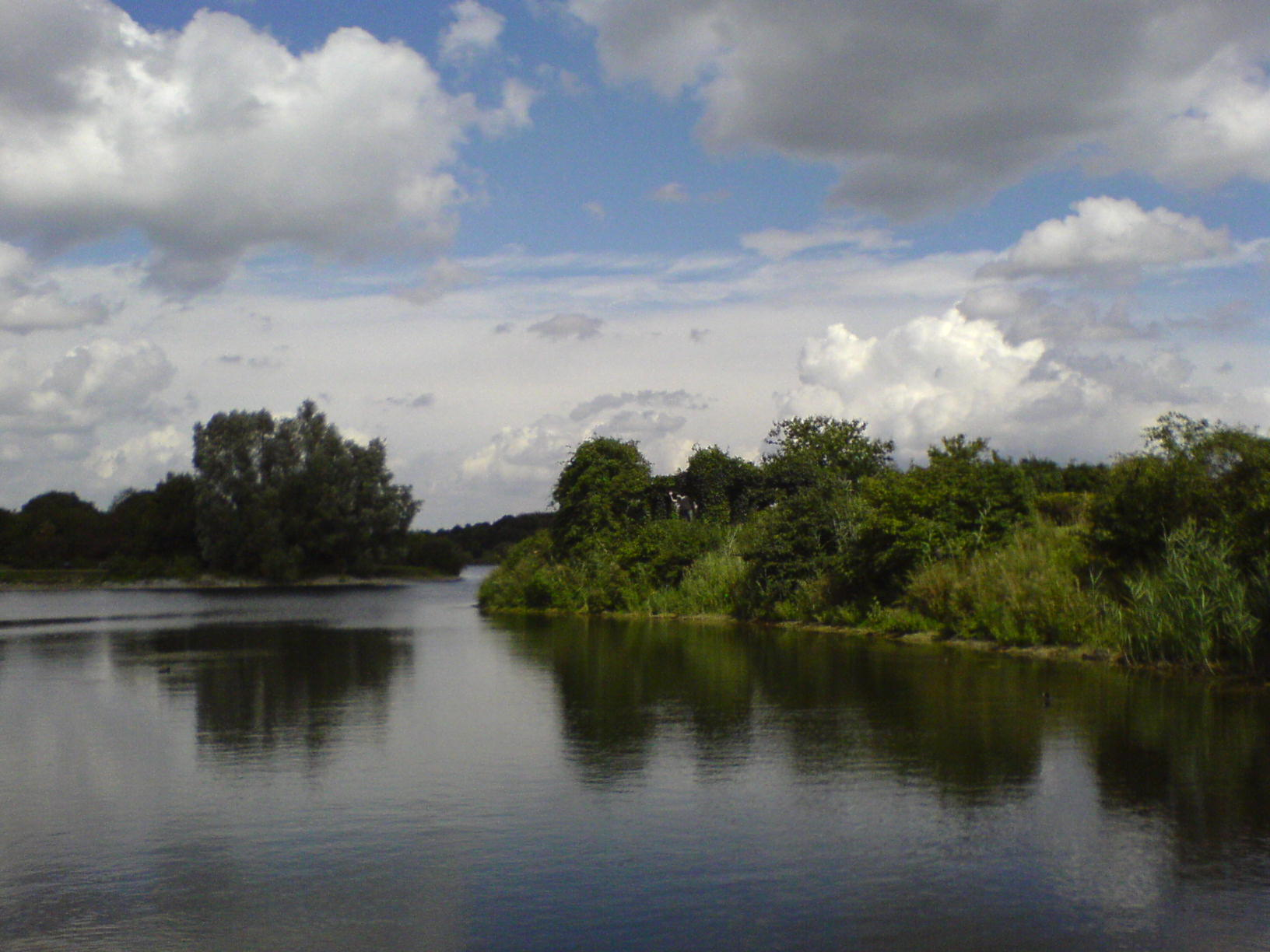

- Location within North Rhine-Westphalia
- Location: North Rhine-Westphalia
- Coordinates: 51°23′6″N 6°37′31″E
- Basin countries: Germany
- Surface area: 0.5 km^{2} (0.19 sq mi)
- Surface elevation: 30 m (98 ft)

Elfrather See is a lake in North Rhine-Westphalia, Germany. At an elevation of 30 m, its surface area is 0.5 square kilometres (0.19 sq mi). The Elfrather lake, popularly known as E for short-sea, is located in the north east of the city of Krefeld on the border of the Elfrath district. The lake was created from a disused gravel pit, which has been filled with groundwater. The degradation was made in the Lower Rhine because of the low water level with typical wetness reduction construction of a dredger. The gravel was taken up in the 1970s for the construction of the A57 motorway, which was set up for the gravel pit as a place of central material supply. After the completion of the lake from the 1970s, it was expanded to its today's recreational area with many spacious lawns.

The lake is now Elfrather primarily a 2.3 kilometres (1.4 mi) long race track. Swimming in the lake is actually banned because of boat traffic. There is a swimming lake next to the regatta course created specifically. On the sheltered by bushes and of the ways her non-accessible areas of the shore and the regatta course is nudist tolerated. Overall, the lake has a water area of 50 hectares (120 acres), the water level is 30 m above sea level. It was not until the early 2000s, that the lake was completed. One problem was Vennikel Street, which had crossed the lake and is now demolished, to expand the regatta course to full length.

A variety of water sports has settled around the lake. The lake offers opportunities for rowers, sailors and windsurfers. Also for model boats, there is a separate area. There are courses available to obtained a license of regatta. For divers, the lake was long uninteresting, only the fire departments and various emergency services trained here regularly. A disused boat is sunk in the lake and is now a wreck for diving despite poor visibility. The DLRG (German Life Saving Association) the lifeguard of the German Red Cross in turn lead supervision on and around the lake.

The lake is separated from the regatta course. Around the lake there is a large lawn, which in summer is always well attended. The entrance to the lake is still free, is only for the parking demands in the summer months for a fee. Nearby there is a large playground, restrooms with showers and toilets, a kiosk and a barbecue area with built stone fireplaces. For kite flying, there is a specially reserved large meadow.
