= Maria Nordman =

American sculptor

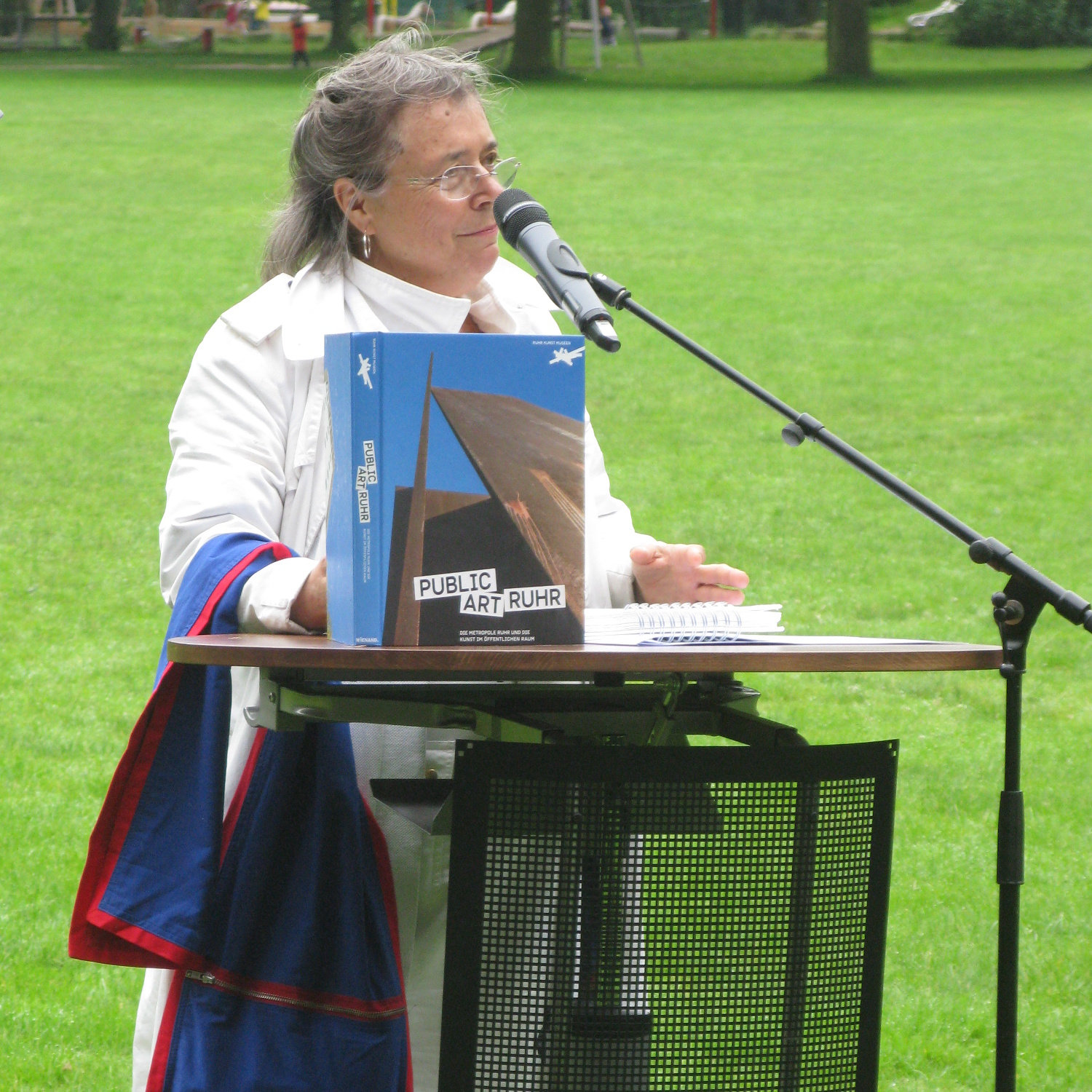
- Born: 21 June 1943 (age 83); Görlitz, Germany
- Education: University of California Los Angeles
- Known for: Sculpture
- Notable work: Filmroom: Smoke (1967–Present), Saddleback Mountain (1973), Tjoba (1981-82), De Civitate (1997)
- Movement: Conceptual Art

Maria Nordman is a German-American sculptor and conceptual artist. She is known for creating the contexts of FILM ROOMS starting in 1967: FILM ROOM EAT 1967-PRESENT and FILM ROOM EXHALE 1967- PRESENT. These two works are the fulcrum of other works that follow, enabling new considerations of rooms as sculpture. Her works in film, still photography, and sculpture variously connect to writing, musical projects, architecture, public space, and performance.

== Life and work ==
Maria Nordman studied at the University of California, Los Angeles (1961–67), where she received her MA. There she met Josef von Sternberg who at the time was teaching Film Directing at UCLA. She also studied Cinematography with Jean-Claude Lubtchansky who at the time worked with Jean-Luc Godard. The production of new ways of working with film, with the actors, the viewers and the proscenium itself is seen from Nordman's earliest works.

They further connect with her architectural projects, the musical composition and performances directly on city streets and neighbourhoods with the chance encounters with passers-by. Parks built by Nordman could function as living places; on the other hand they may have to do only with the direct passage of the sun. Experienced in city streets and parks, her work process includes three realizations at the Venice Biennial and as well three works in Kassel, part of Documenta.

== Exhibitions ==
From 1967 to 1969 Nordman created film environments and laser projections. Since 1970 she has been designing places that achieve complex aesthetic effects with minimal means (such as sunlight, colour, air, water and sound). Man becomes part of these spaces. Nordman has exhibited at Documenta in Germany in 1977, 1982 and 1987. She has exhibited in Italy and held her first Berlin solo show in 2013. Her work has been shown internationally at such institutions as the Stedelijk Museum, Belgium (2013), the Los Angeles County Museum of Art, California (2011), the Museu Serralves, Portugal (2007), the Museum Folkwang, Essen, Germany (1997), and Dia Art Foundation, New York (1991). Her work has been included in group shows at the Castello di Rivoli Museo d’Arte Contemporanea, Turin (2011), the Centre Pompidou, Paris (2006), and MoMA PS1, New York (1999).

== Collections ==
Nordman's work is in the collections of the Museum of Contemporary Art Los Angeles and the Los Angeles County Museum of Art in the United States, and several Fracs in France.

== Literature ==
- Corinna Ferrari, Maria Nordman Progetti per Uno Spazio Aperto in Un Contesto Urbano, Lux Lucus, April, 1979
- Germano Celant, Translated by Howard Rodger Maclean, Urban Nature: The Work of Maria Nordman, Artforum, March, 1980
- Kenneth Baker, Minimal installation, The Boston Phoenix, October, 1981
- Bruno Cora, III De Civitate, Maria Nordman, 1987
- Germano Celant, Translated by Marguerite Shore, Maria Nordman Conjunct City of Light, Artforum, 1990
- Michael Brenson, Reviews/Art; Maria Nordman's Exhibition of Permanent Transience, The New York Times, November 30, 1990
- Erich Franz, Maria Nordman – De Civitate, Munster 1991, Skulptur Projekte, 1991
- Adachiara Zevi, Maria Nordman proposals for the conjunct city, L/Architettura Cronache e Storta, Volume 426, March, 1991
- Interview by Theodora Vischer, MOVEABLE STRUCTURE / HOUSE IN AN OPEN PLACE, Maria Nordman & Theodora Vischer in Conversation, Parkett No 29, June, 1991
- Patricia C. Phillips, Maria Nordman, Marian Goodman Gallery, Artforum, February, 1993
- Sharon Mizota, PST, A to Z: Maria Nordman, ‘Film Room: Smoke’ at LACMA, Los Angeles Times, September 7, 2011
- Scott Tennent, Conversation with Maria Nordman, LACMA Blog, April 3, 2012
- Yanyan Huang, Happening now: Art 43 Basel, Haute Living, June 10, 2012
- James Merle Thomas, Maria Nordman: Geo-Aesthetics, Artforum, May, 2013
- Agnieszka Gratza E, Event Sculpture 5: Maria Nordman, 'FluienS Circulus,' Henry Moore Foundation, January 7, 2015
- Gabriela Vainsencher, Hidden Artworks That Come with Instructions, HyperAllergic, July 17, 2015
- Lauren O'Neill-Butler, Maria Nordman, Marian Goodman Gallery, Artforum, October, 2015
- Laura Richard, In Situ and On Location: The Early Works of Maria Nordman, University of California, Berkeley, 2015
