= Hopsten =

- Municipality
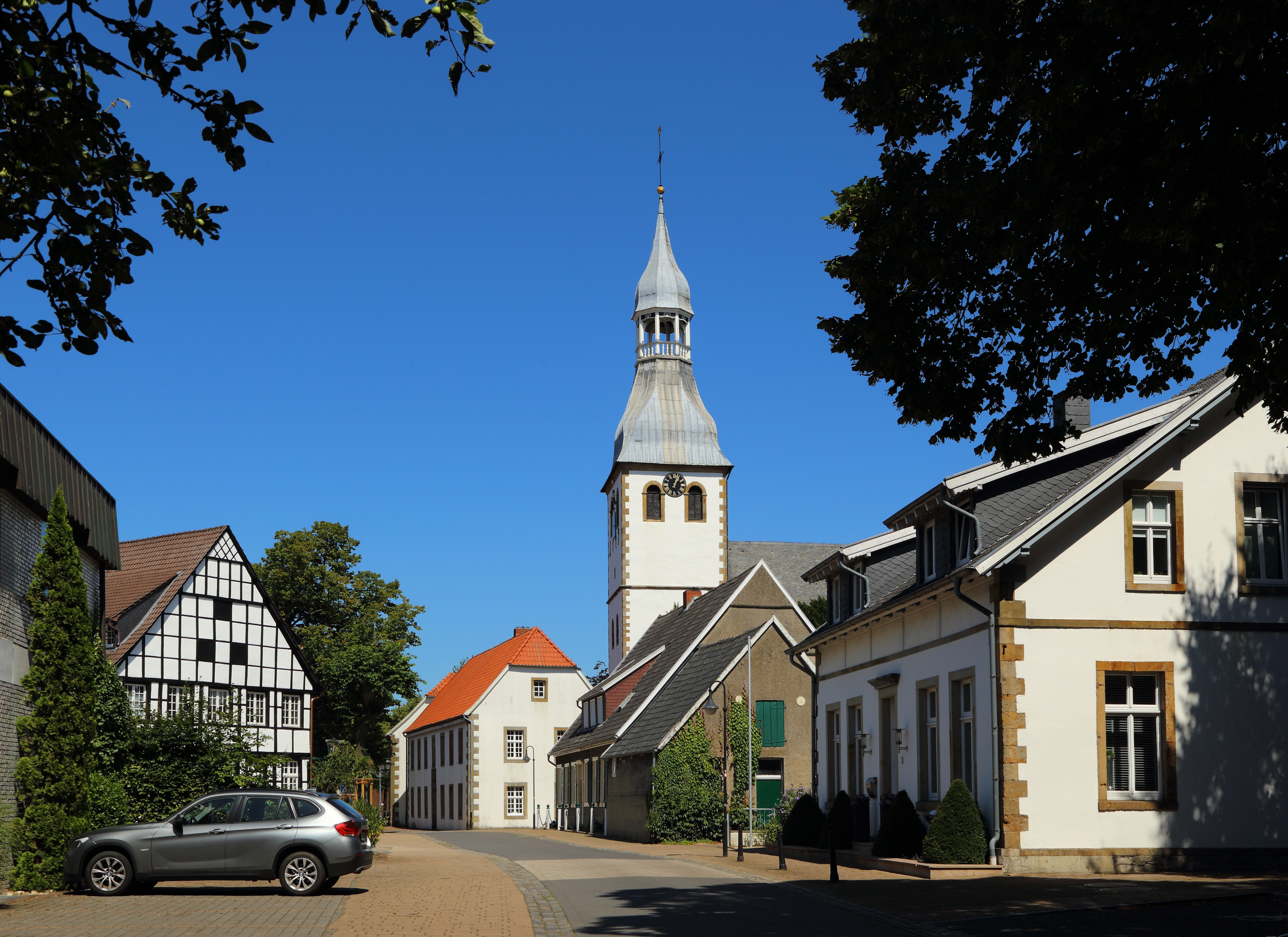
- Historical center of the town

- Flag Coat of arms

- Location of Hopsten within Steinfurt district
- Interactive map of Hopsten
- Location within Germany Location within North Rhine-Westphalia
- Coordinates: 52°22′50″N 7°36′00″E
- Country: Germany
- State: North Rhine-Westphalia
- Admin. region: Münster
- District: Steinfurt
- Subdivisions: 3

Government
  - Mayor (2020–25): Ludger Kleine-Harmeyer (CDU)

Area
  - Total: 99.8 km^{2} (38.5 sq mi)
- Elevation: 40 m (130 ft)

Population (2025-12-31)
  - Total: 7,620
  - Density: 76.4/km^{2} (198/sq mi)
- Time zone: UTC+01:00 (CET)
  - Summer (DST): UTC+02:00 (CEST)
- Postal codes: 48496
- Dialling codes: 05458
- Vehicle registration: ST
- Website: www.hopsten.de

Hopsten is a municipality in the district of Steinfurt, in North Rhine-Westphalia, Germany. It is situated approximately 15 km northeast of Rheine and 25 km southeast of Lingen.

== Population ==
Historical population

Year	Pop.	±% p.a.
1965	5,514	—
1970	5,748	+0.83%
1975	5,908	+0.55%
1980	5,821	−0.30%
1985	5,907	+0.29%
1990	6,059	+0.51%
1995	6,642	+1.85%

Year	Pop.	±% p.a.
2000	7,587	+2.70%
2005	7,742	+0.41%
2010	7,585	−0.41%
2015	7,642	+0.15%
2020	7,643	+0.00%
2025	7,620	−0.06%

Source: Landesdatabank Nordrhein-Westfalen

== People ==
- Bernhard Otte (1883-1933), politician and trade union leader
- Franz-Josef Kemper (born 1945), athlete

== Gallery ==
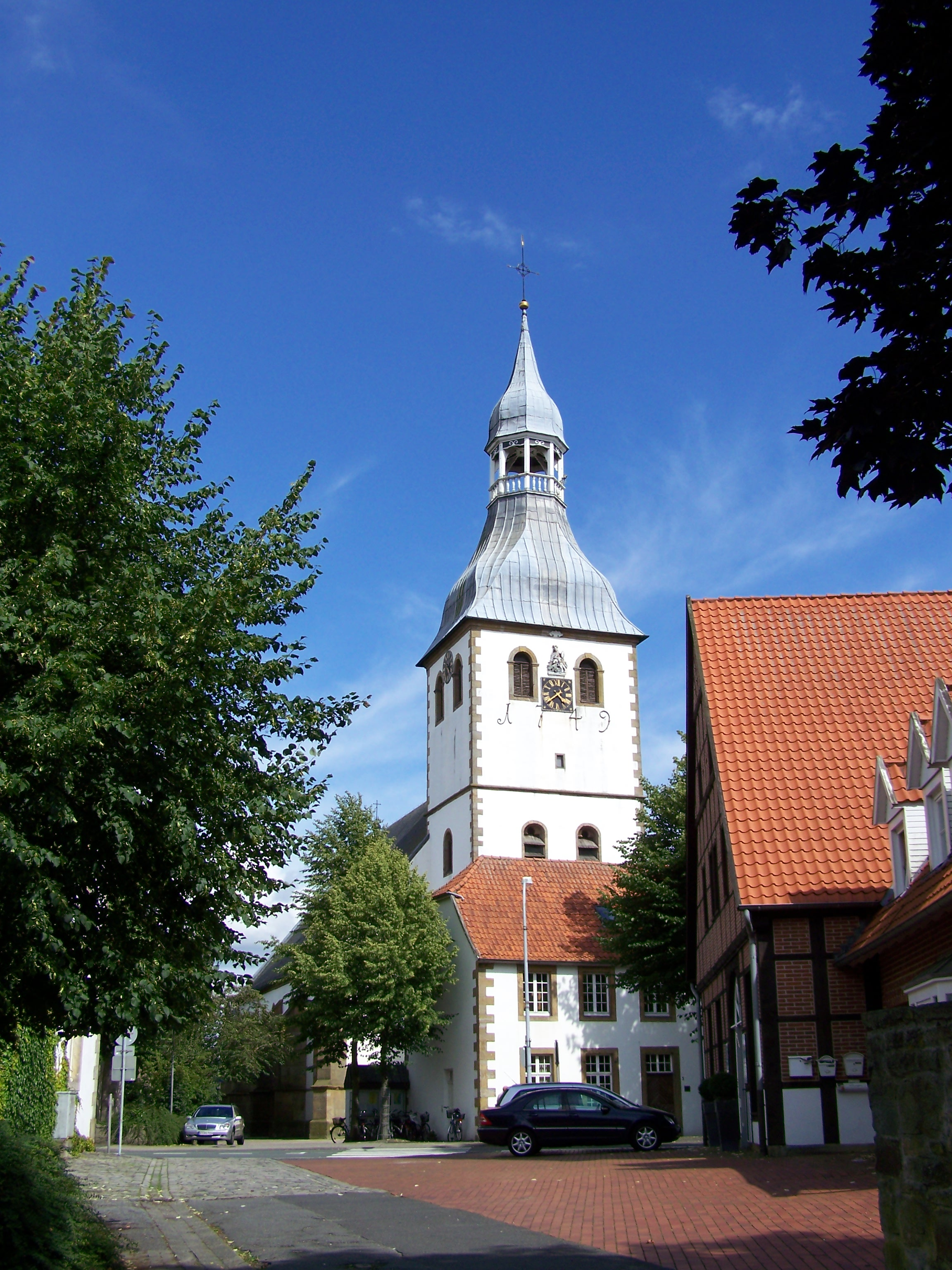
Catholic Church

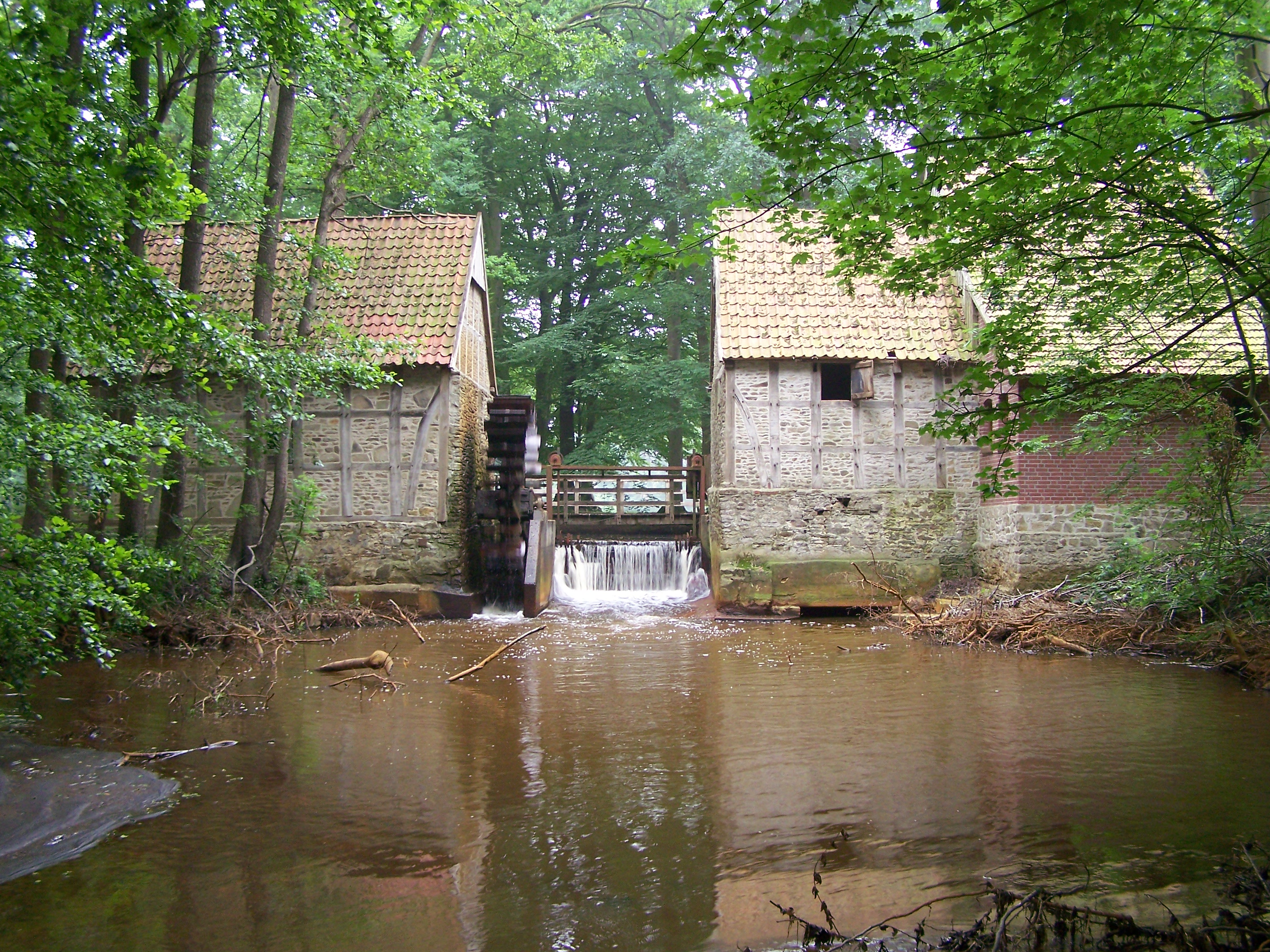
Mill Halverde

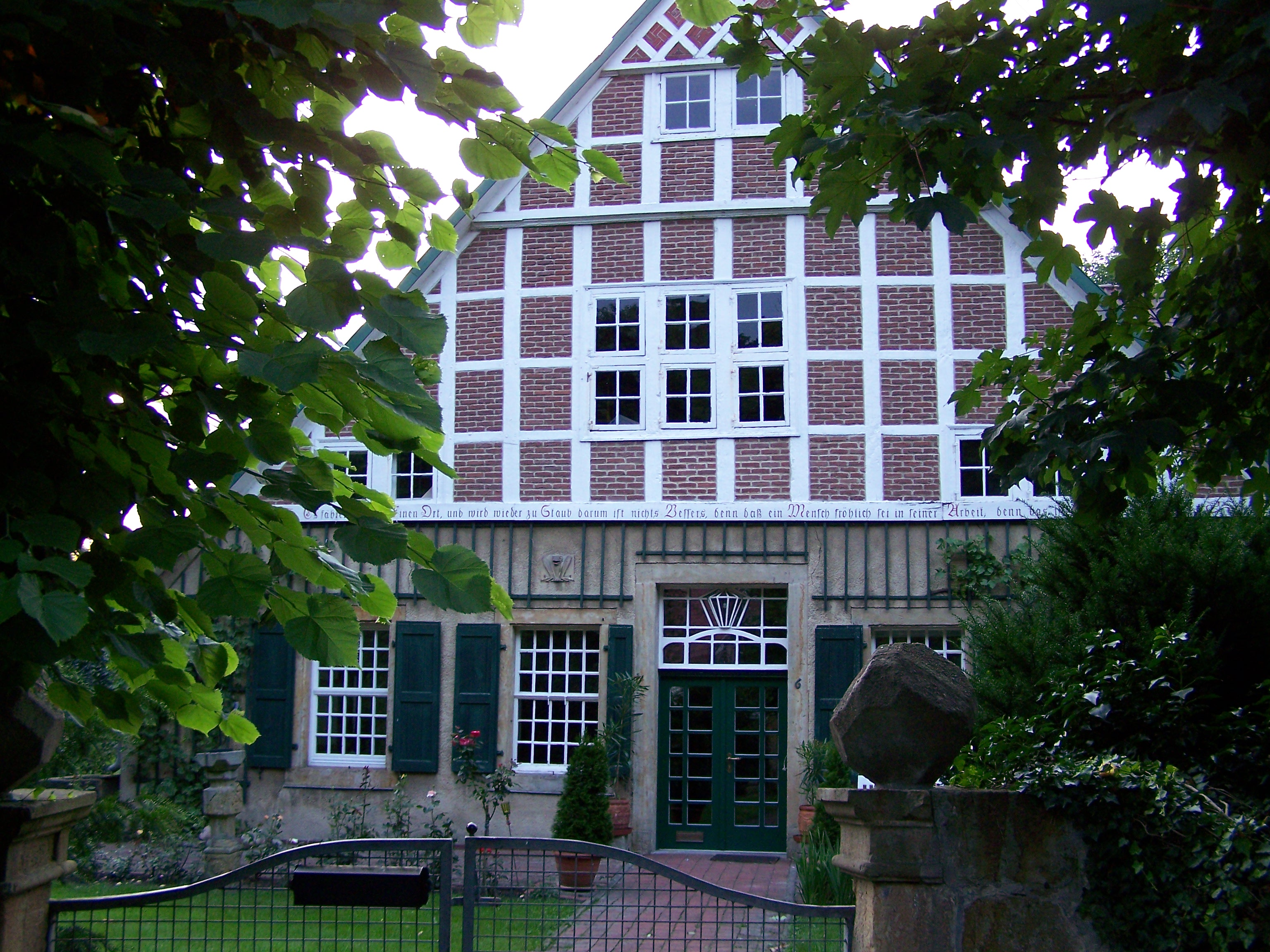
Haus Nieland

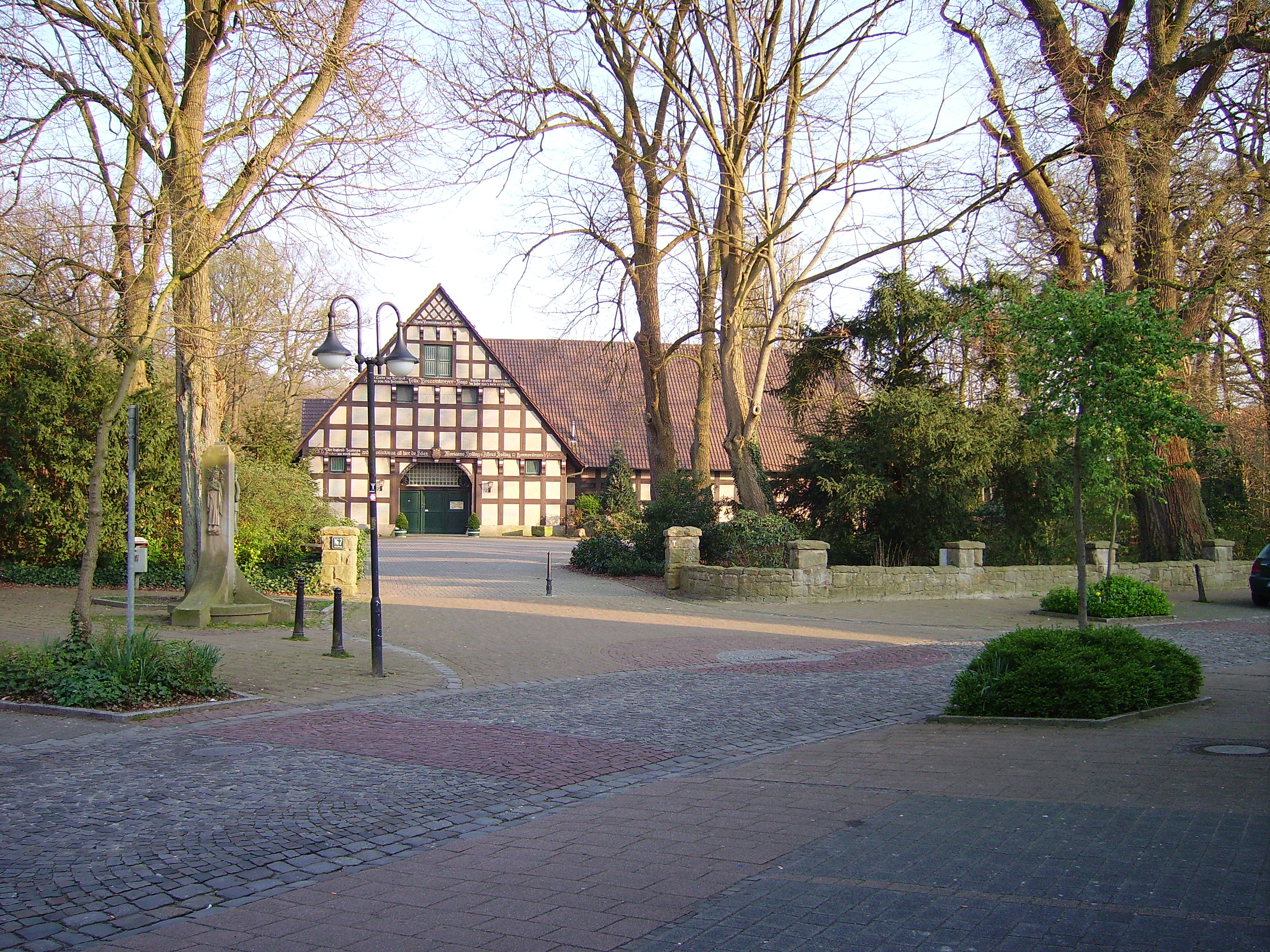
Hof Holling on the Brennikmeyer Street
