= Rhein-Erft-Kreis =

Coordinates: 50°55′N 6°40′E

- District
- Flag Coat of arms
- Country: Germany
- State: North Rhine-Westphalia
- Adm. region: Cologne
- Capital: Bergheim

Government
  - District admin.: Frank Rock (CDU)

Area
  - Total: 704.5 km^{2} (272.0 sq mi)

Population (31 December 2023)
  - Total: 480,989
  - Density: 680/km^{2} (1,800/sq mi)
- Time zone: UTC+01:00 (CET)
  - Summer (DST): UTC+02:00 (CEST)
- Vehicle registration: BM
- Website: http://www.rhein-erft-kreis.de

The Rhein-Erft-Kreis (Kölsch: Rhing-Ärff-Kries) is a district in the west of North Rhine-Westphalia, Germany. Neighboring districts are Neuss, district-free Cologne, Rhein-Sieg, Euskirchen, Düren.

== History ==
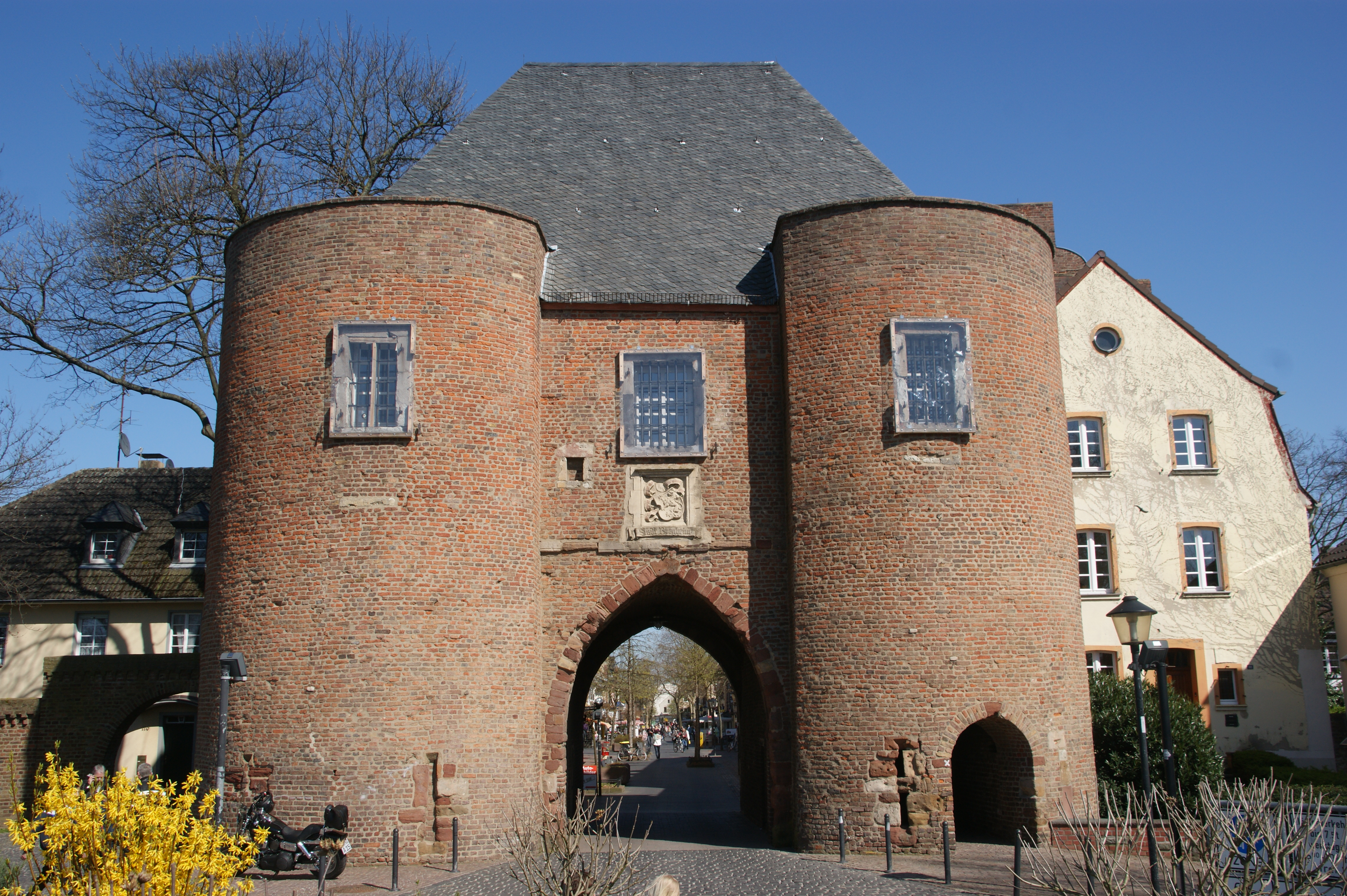
"Aachener Tor" Landmark of Bergheim and Rhein-Erft-Kreis

The district in its current borders was created in 1975, when the previous districts Bergheim and Cologne were merged. On 1 November 2003 the district was renamed from Erftkreis to Rhein-Erft-Kreis.

== Geography ==
Clickable map of municipalities in the district

The main river in the district is the Erft, which also gave it the name. The Erft flows through the foothills of the Eifel, on the left side of the Rhine river. The lake Bleibtreusee is located within the district.

=== Towns ===
- Bedburg
- Bergheim
- Brühl
- Elsdorf
- Erftstadt
- Frechen
- Hürth
- Kerpen
- Pulheim
- Wesseling

== Coat of arms ==
The coat of arms shows the lion of Jülich in the left half, as most of the area belonged to the duchy of Jülich. The right side shows the Cologne cross, which stands for the former Cologne district. On top the Erft river is depicted; the Prussian Rhine Province had the same symbol in its coat of arms.

== Gallery ==
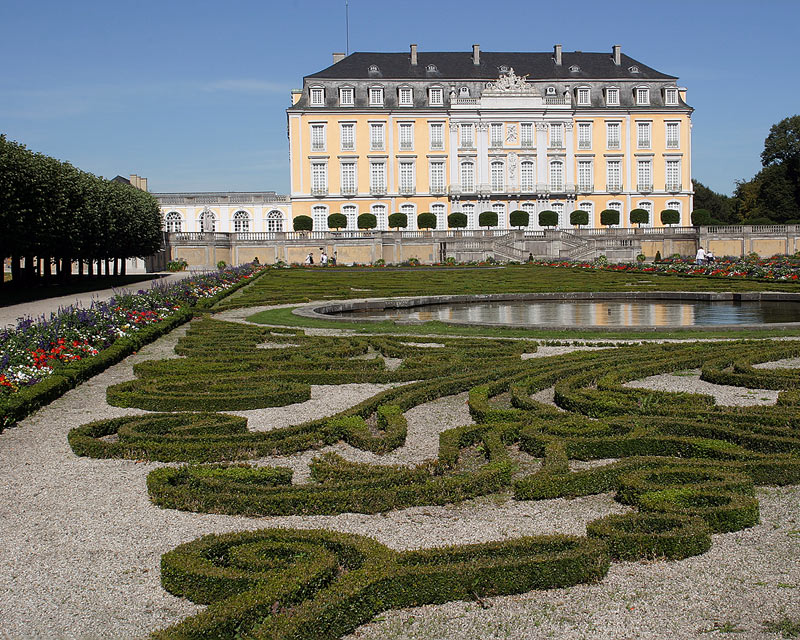
Augustusburg Palace in Brühl, Rhein-Erft-Kreis.

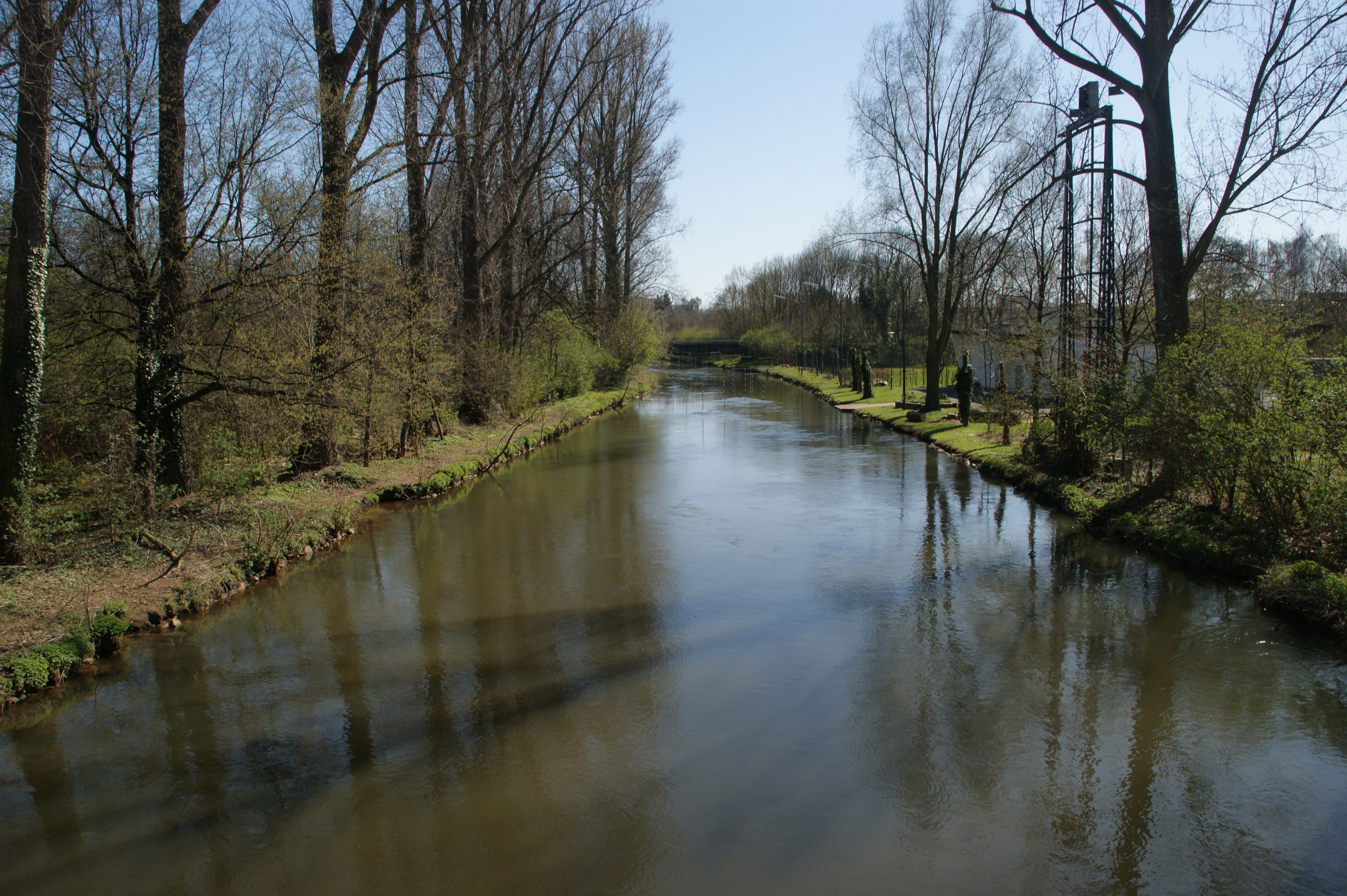
The Erft river in Bergheim.

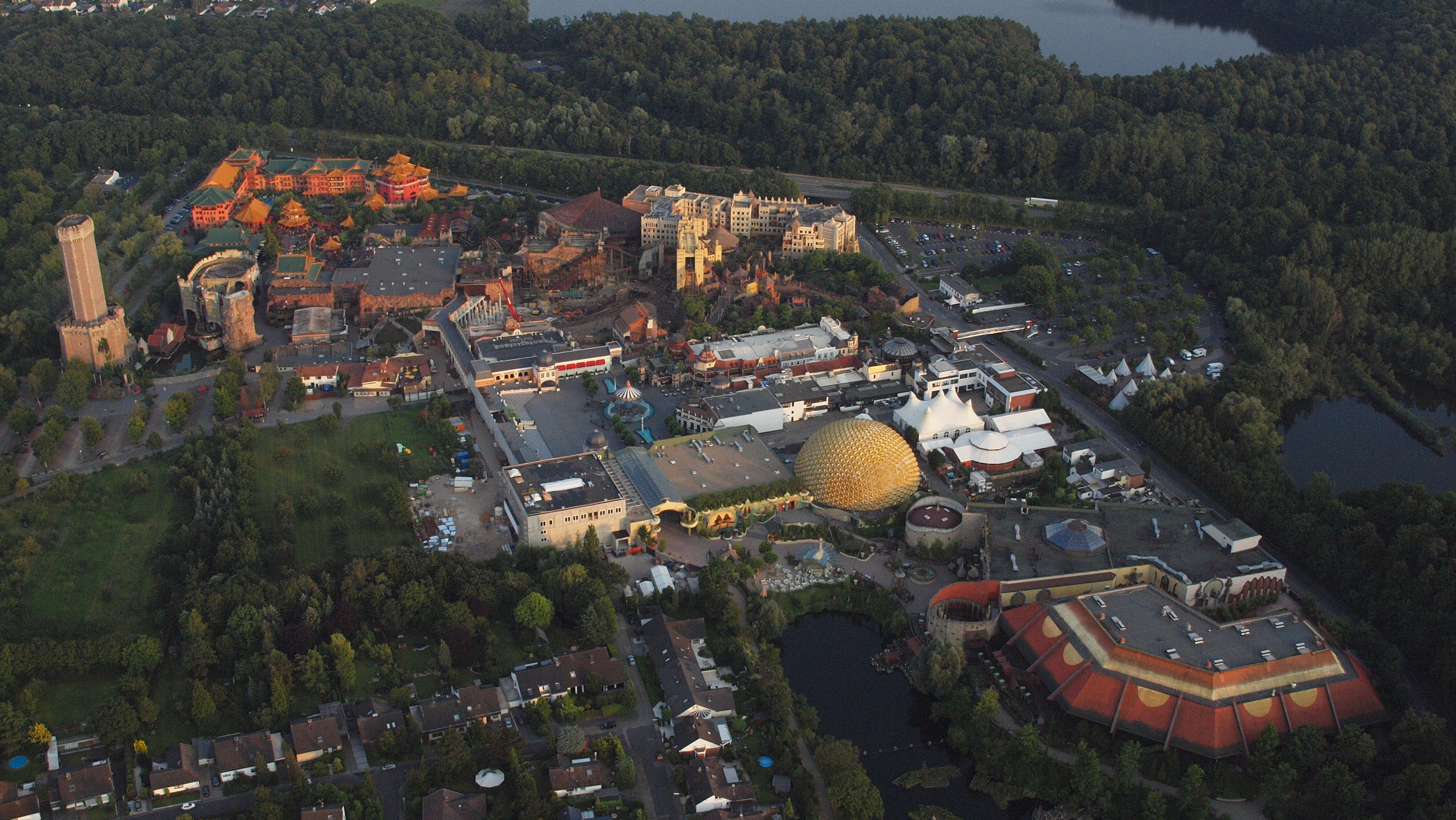
Aerial photo of Phantasialand amusement park in Brühl.

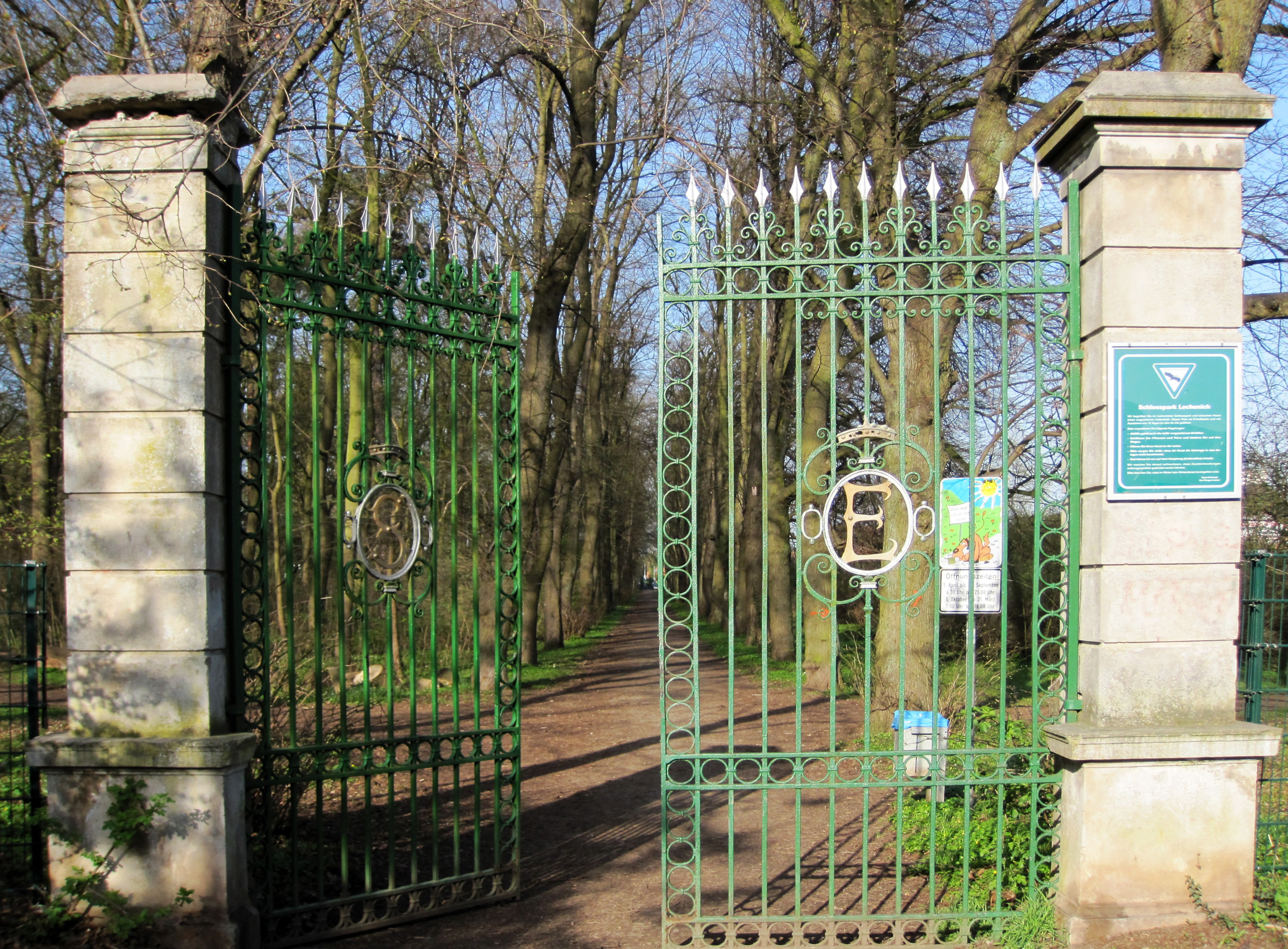
Gates of Parkanlagen Schloss Lechenich in Erftstadt.
