= Schöneseiffen =

- Stadtteil of Schleiden
- Interactive map of Schöneseiffen
- Location within Germany Location within North Rhine-Westphalia
- Coordinates: 50°31′10″N 6°23′47″E
- Country: Germany
- State: North Rhine-Westphalia
- Town: Schleiden
- Elevation: 585 m (1,919 ft)

Population (2021)
  - Total: 433
- Time zone: UTC+01:00 (CET)
  - Summer (DST): UTC+02:00 (CEST)
- Postal codes: 53937
- Dialling codes: 02485

Schöneseiffen is a village southwest of Schleiden in the county of Euskirchen in the German state of North Rhine-Westphalia. The Dieffenbach stream rises north of the village. Schöneseiffen has a population of 433 (2021). Schöneseiffen has sports field, a Bürgerhaus and a youth centre.

== Geography ==
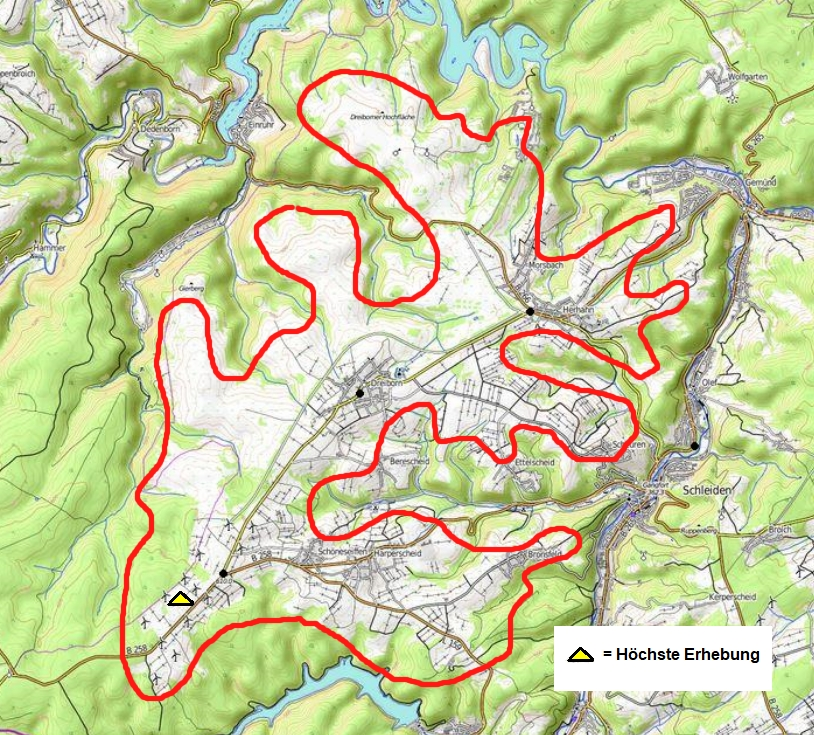
Dreiborn Plateau

Schöneseiffen lies in North Rhine-Westphalia in der Rur Eifel region, west of the town of Schleiden, not far from the Belgian border on the Dreiborn Plateau above the valley of the Olef. In the parish of Schöneseiffen is the Hollerscheid, the highest point on the Dreiborn Plateau, 622.7 metres above sea level (NHN).

== History ==
Schöneseiffen is first recorded on 19 October 1322 along with Bronsfeld and Harperscheid.

In accordance with § 9 of the 1971 Aachen Act, the village was incorporated into the borough of Schleiden on 1 January 1972.

== Schleiden-Schöneseiffen Wind Farm ==
To the west, on the B 258, is the Schleiden-Schöneseiffen wind park with 18 wind turbines. In 2014–2015, 12 of the 17 generators underwent a repowering from the Tacke TW 1.5 and were replaced by 13 Enercon E-101s. Together with the remaining Enercon E-82 E2s and the remaining five Tacke TW 1.5 MW turbines the wind farm has a total capacity of 49.45 MW, making it one of the seven largest in North Rhine-Westphalia.

== Nature and local recreation ==
The highland area is attractive to tourists with its long views over the valley of the Olef, the nearby Eifel National Park and the Dreiborn Plateau. Its proximity to the Olef Reservoir and the Hellenthal Wildlife Enclosure and the extensive network of waymarked trails also make it popular.

== Transport ==
The B 258 runs through Schöneseiffen. The nearest motorway junctions are Nettersheim on the A 1, Aachen-Lichtenbusch on the A 44 and Wißkirchen on the A 1
