= Scheuren (Schleiden) =

- Ortsteil of Schleiden
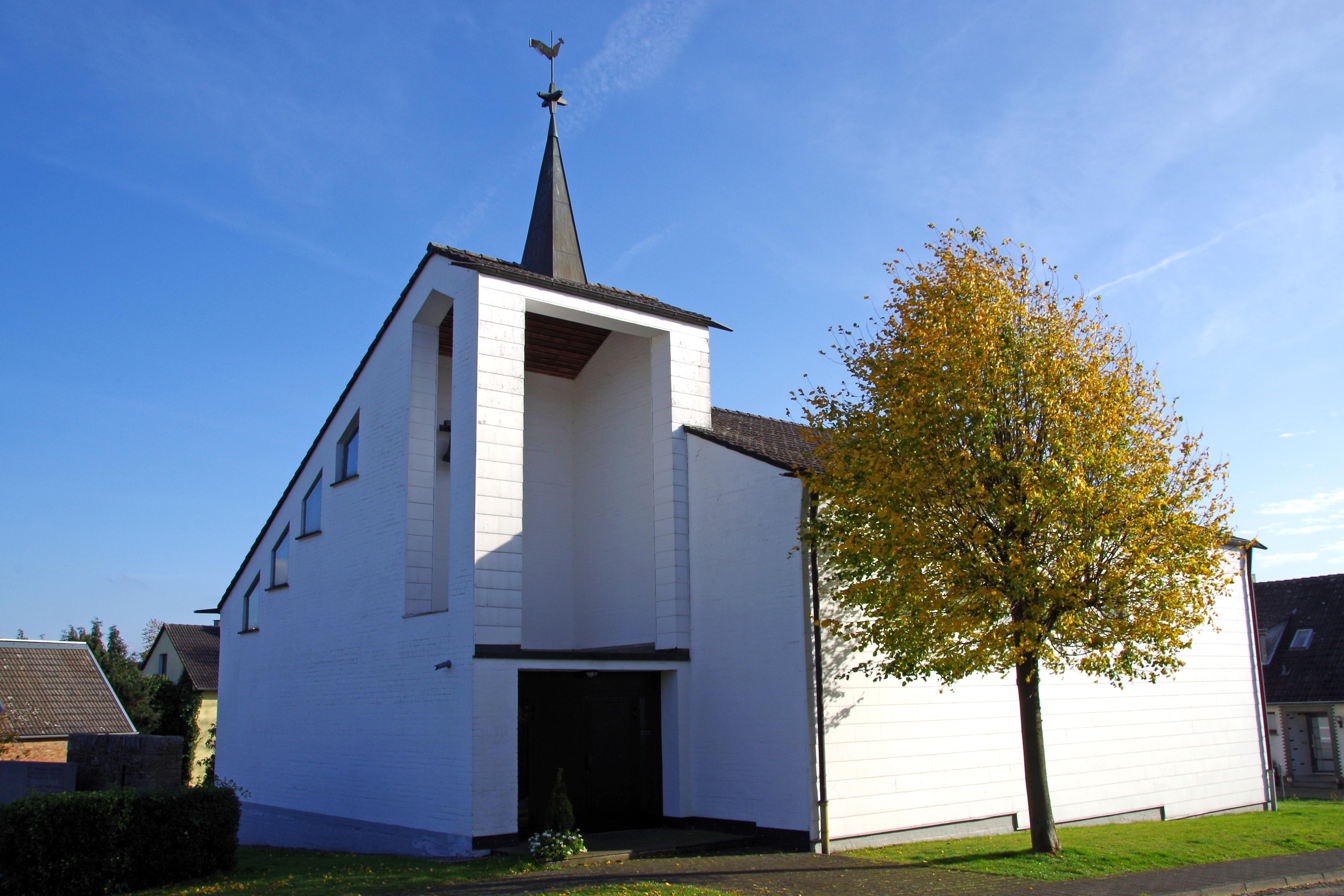
- Chapel of the Mother of God, Scheuren
- Interactive map of Scheuren
- Location within Germany Location within North Rhine-Westphalia
- Coordinates: 50.5358°N 6.4658°E
- Country: Germany
- State: North Rhine-Westphalia
- Town: Schleiden
- Elevation: 495 m (1,624 ft)

Population (2020)
  - Total: 364
- Time zone: UTC+01:00 (CET)
  - Summer (DST): UTC+02:00 (CEST)
- Postal codes: 53937
- Dialling codes: 02445

Scheuren is a village in the west of Schleiden borough in the county of Euskirchen in the German state of North Rhine-Westphalia. In the village there is a community centre and a Roman Catholic chapel. The Höddelbach stream flows by to the north. Scheuren lies between the hills of Lamesberg, Heuberg, Wiesenberg and Huppertsharth.

== History ==
In the 14th century Scheuren belonged to the Unterherrschaft of Dreiborn in the Duchy of Jülich.

Until the reorganization of the municipalities and districts within the Aachen region, which took effect on 1 January 1972, Scheuren belonged to the municipality of Dreiborn, which was dissolved at the same time.

== Culture ==
Clubs and societies in Scheuren include the villagers' association (Bürgerverein), which organizes festivals and events in the village, the chapel society, which takes care of church matters in the village, and the theatre club, which puts on a few plays every year.

== Transport ==
Scheuren is located on the Kreisstraße 66, which runs from Dreiborn to the B258 federal road at the western end of Schleiden centre. The nearest motorway junctions are Nettersheim on the A 1 and Aachen-Lichtenbusch on the A 44.

The VRS bus line 831 of the RVK connects Scheuren with Schleiden and Gemünd.

Line	Route
831	TaxiBusPlus (außer im Schülerverkehr Gemünd – Dreiborn): Gemünd – (Herhahn –) Morsbach – Dreiborn – Berescheid – Ettelscheid – Scheuren – Schleiden
