= Scheuren =

Scheuren could refer to:

- Scheuren, Switzerland, a municipality in the canton of Bern, Switzerland
- Scheuren (Schleiden), a village in North Rhine-Westphalia, Germany
- Caspar Scheuren (1810–1887), German painter and illustrator
- Donna Scheuren, American politician
- Fritz Scheuren, American statistician
