= Rhein-Sieg-Eisenbahn =

German railway company

Rhein-Sieg-Eisenbahn GmbH
- Industry: Rail transport
- Founded: November 1994
- Headquarters: Bonn, Germany
- Website: www.rhein-sieg-eisenbahn.de

The Rhein-Sieg-Eisenbahn or RSE is a German company founded by the Verkehrsclub Deutschland (Transport Club of Germany) and interested private individuals with the primary purpose of saving a threatened industrial line, the Beuel–Großenbusch railway.

A joint venture RSE Cargo was formed with logistics company Hoyer with RSE providing a railway company licence. In 2000 Hoyer acquired a majority share in RSE Cargo and renamed it Hoyer Railserv.

== History ==
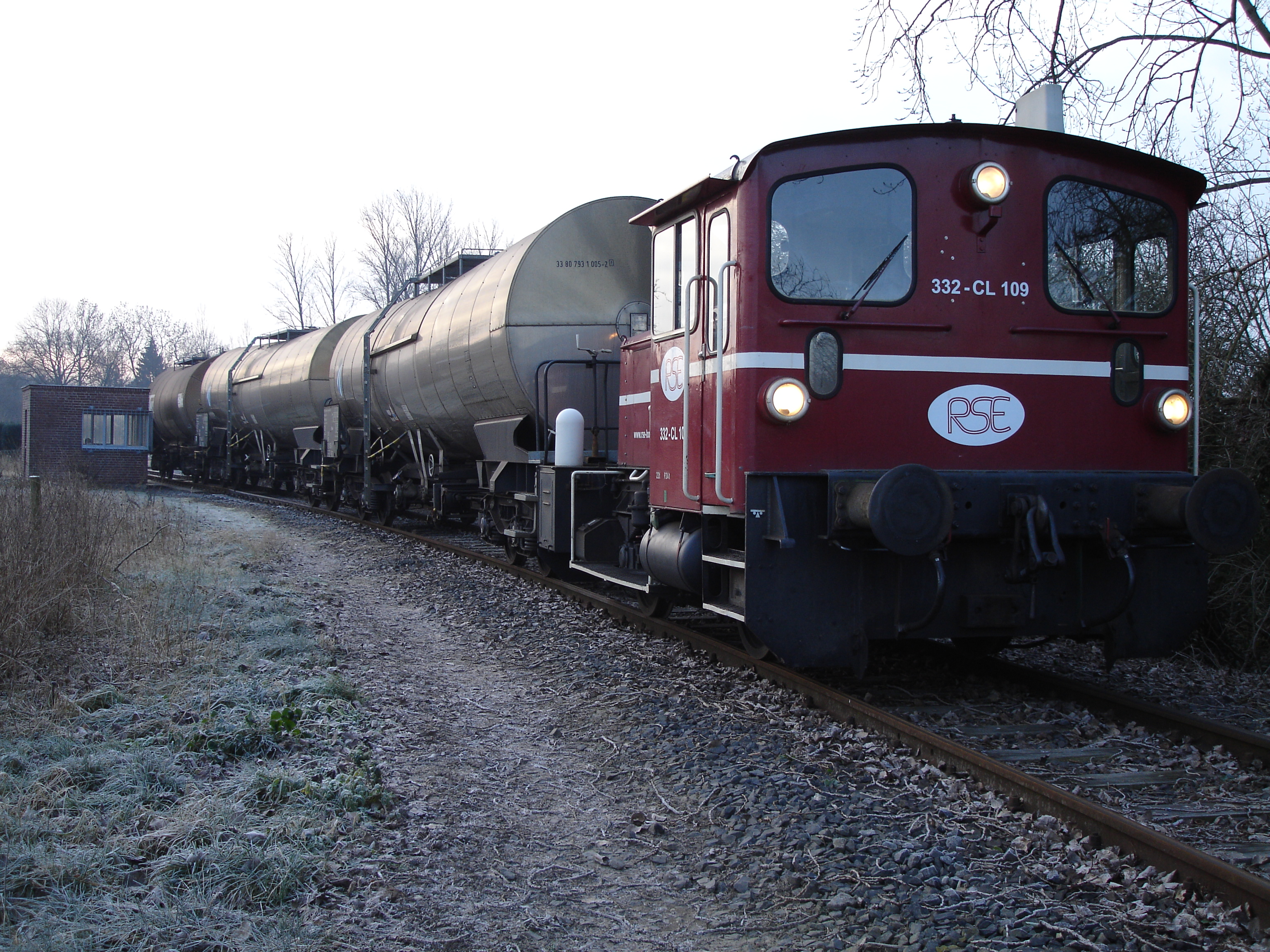
RSE loco at Oberbruch

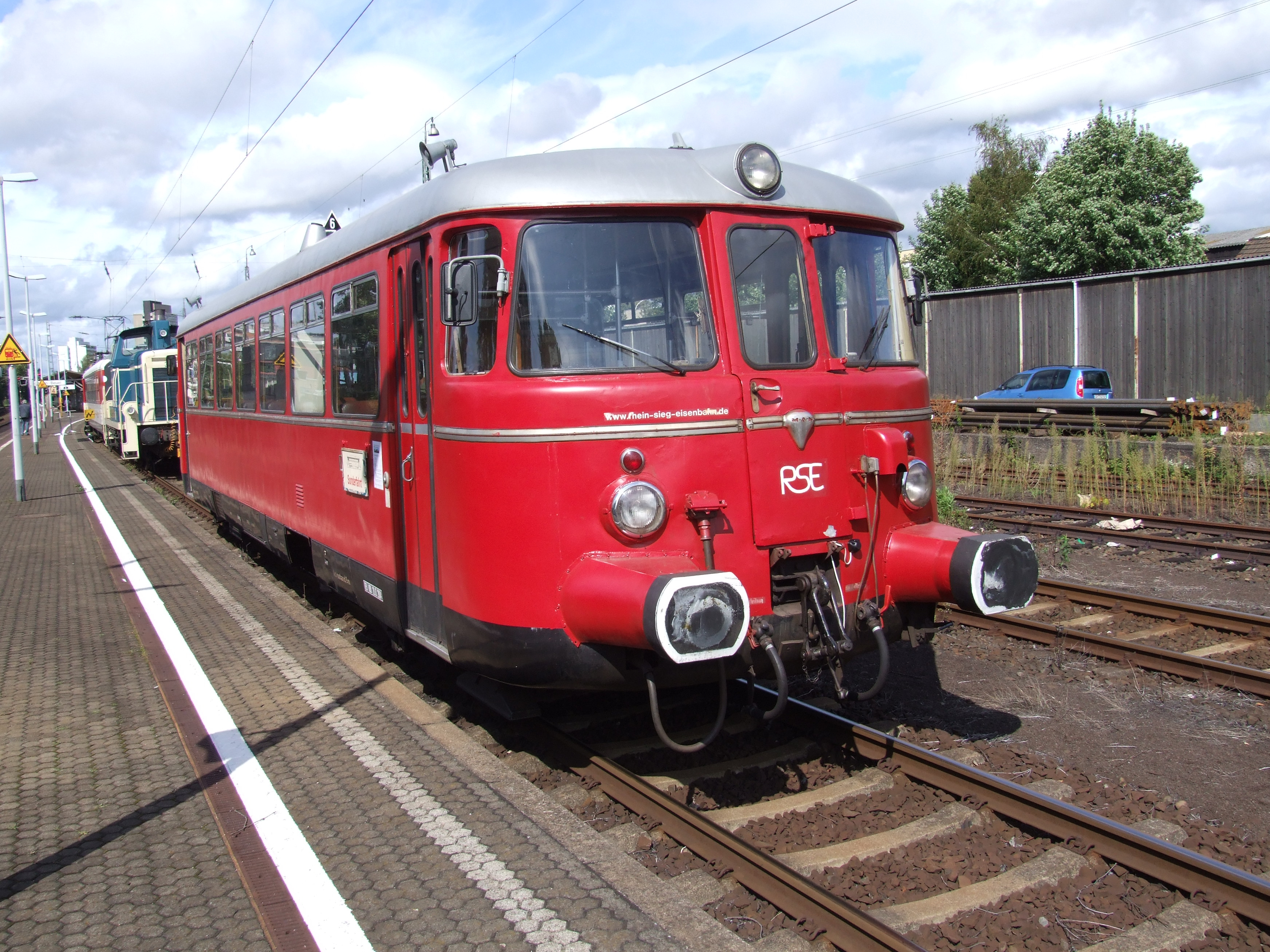
MAN VT 25 at Bonn-Beuel station

Today the RSE operates Germany-wide, not least as the railway infrastructure company for just under 90 km (56 mi) of railway lines in three different in federal states (as at: October 2008):

- Bad Endorf–Obing, Bavaria
- Bonn-Beuel – Hangelar (in the town of Sankt Augustin), North Rhine-Westphalia (NRW)
- Eggmühl–Langquaid, Bavaria
- Höddelbusch – Schleiden (Olef Valley Railway), NRW
- Osberghausen (in the town of Engelskirchen) – Oberwiehl (Wiehl Valley Railway), NRW
- Rahden – Uchte, NRW / Lower Saxony

In addition the RSE acts as a railway operator, providing passenger and goods services on other routes. For example, (as at: September 2005) it serves the goods facilities at Bonn-Beuel, Siegburg Siegwerk, Sindorf (in the town of Kerpen) and Wiehl (all in NRW), which are integrated into the national and international rail freight transport network.

Since June 2007 the RSE has rebranded its home station at Bonn-Beuel as Railport Bonn. Under the internet address www.railport-bonn.de werden the logistic services provided by this, the only goods station in the Bonn region, are outlined.

In spring 2007 the RSE agreed a Joint Venture with the Nuon industrial railway of the Oberbruch Chemical Works (Chemiepark), which means that RSE engine drivers can pair off and work together with a Nuon shunter when marshalling on the Oberbruch site. Instead of the fireless locomotive an RSE diesel locomotive now works the yard. The reason for this was that the licence on the Meiningen class of fireless loco previously used had run out and it had to be retired.

The Oberbruch Chemical Works hopes to achieve greater flexibility, contacts with new customers and greater use of the railway operation with this new joint working arrangement (see also: Wurmtalbahn)

In 2007 the RSE was given approval to run the Passau–Freyung railway. As the Ilztalbahn company it aims to take over the maintenance of the line.

The RSE has recently (2008) begun attempts to restart services on the line from Menden to Hemer. This railway is interesting because it would enable a direct connexion to the state garden show in 2010 at Hemer. In autumn 2008 all participants (the towns of Hemer and Menden, DB Netz and the railway area development company) were in favour of reinstating passenger rail services.

On 1 November 2008 the RSE was given a 5-year licence to operate services after it had taken over the section of line from Kall to Schleiden-Oberhausen, the so-called Oleftalbahn. It had already taken ownership of the section from Höddelbusch to Schleiden station in 1999. As early as 11 December permission was given for it to work the entire route to Hellenthal; however the Schleiden-Oberhausen - Hellenthal section still belongs to DB Netz.
