= Schleiden =

- Town
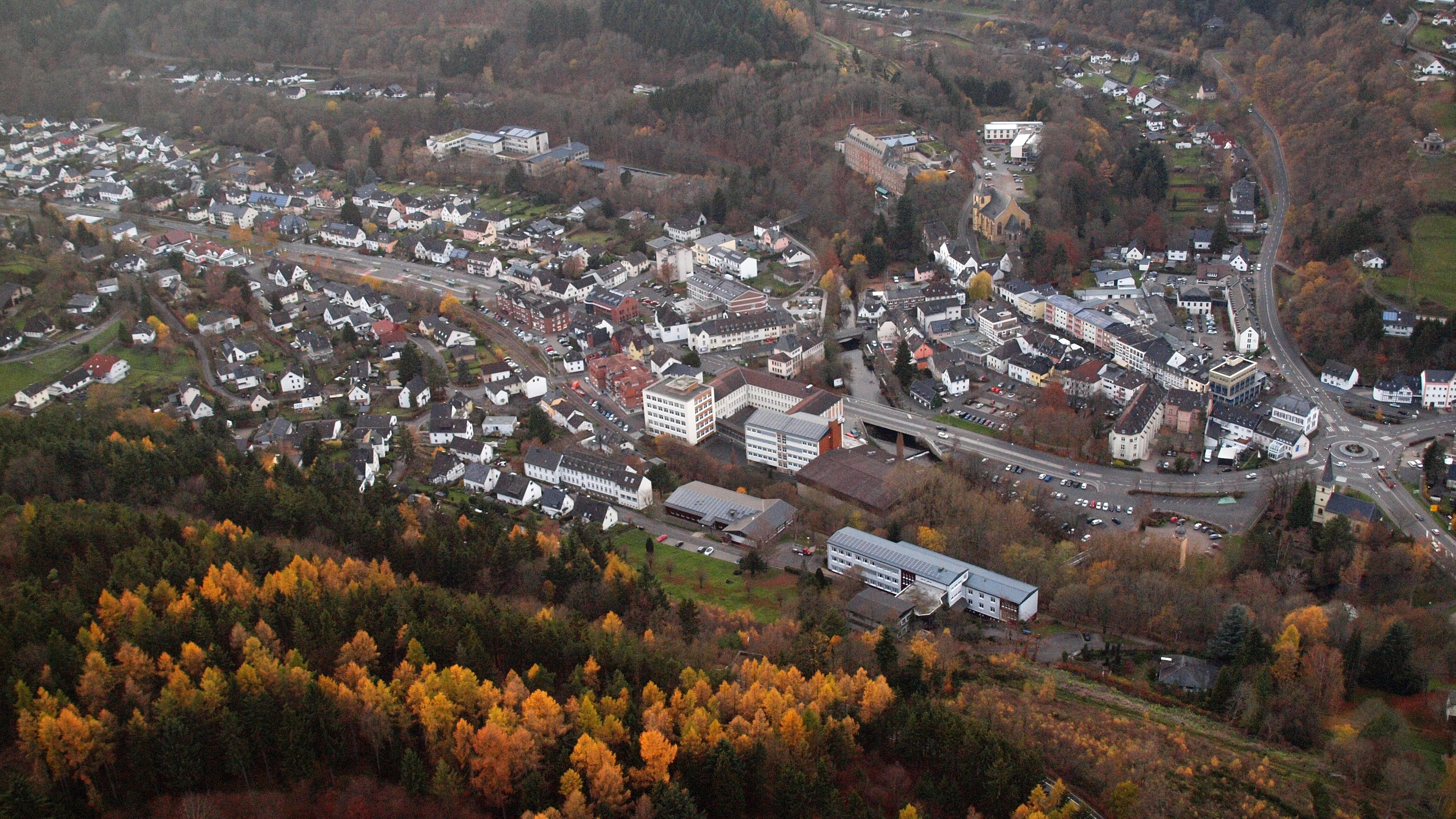
- Aerial view

- Flag Coat of arms

- Location of Schleiden within Euskirchen district
- Interactive map of Schleiden
- Location within Germany Location within North Rhine-Westphalia
- Coordinates: 50°31′59″N 06°28′00″E
- Country: Germany
- State: North Rhine-Westphalia
- Admin. region: Köln
- District: Euskirchen

Government
  - Mayor (2018–23): Ingo Pfennings (CDU)

Area
  - Total: 121.67 km^{2} (46.98 sq mi)
- Elevation: 456 m (1,496 ft)

Population (2025-12-31)
  - Total: 13,390
  - Density: 110.1/km^{2} (285.0/sq mi)
- Time zone: UTC+01:00 (CET)
  - Summer (DST): UTC+02:00 (CEST)
- Postal codes: 53937
- Dialling codes: 02445
- Vehicle registration: EU, SLE
- Website: www.schleiden.de

Schleiden (German pronunciation: [ˈʃlaɪdn̩]) is a town in North Rhine-Westphalia, Germany. It lies in the Eifel hills, in the district of Euskirchen, and has 12,998 inhabitants as of 30 June 2017. Schleiden is connected by a tourist railway to Kall, on the Eifel Railway between Cologne and Trier. The town consists of 18 settlements, the largest of which are Gemünd and Schleiden proper.

== Geography ==
The Roer-tributary Urft and the Urft-tributary Olef are the most important rivers within Schleiden. Parts of the Kermeter and the Dreiborn Plateau with the Ordensburg Vogelsang belong to Schleiden.

=== Subdivisions ===
The municipality of Schleiden is divided into 18 settlements (population figures of those at their main residence as at September 2020):

Settlement	Population
Berescheid	192
Broich	375
Bronsfeld	572
Dreiborn	988
Ettelscheid	275
Gemünd	3,868
Harperscheid	426
Herhahn	463
Kerperscheid	80
Morsbach	556
Nierfeld	451
Oberhausen	838
Olef	1,120
Scheuren	371
Schleiden	2,289
Schöneseiffen	424
Wintzen	85
Wolfgarten	209
Total	13,582

=== Neighbouring municipalities ===
- North: Heimbach (Eifel) (district of Düren)
- East: Mechernich, Kall (both in the district of Euskirchen)
- South: Hellenthal (district of Euskirchen)
- West: Monschau, Simmerath (both in the district of Aachen)

== History ==
Historical affiliations

County of Luxembourg 1271–1353
Duchy of Luxembourg 1353–1795
French Republic 1795–1804
French Empire 1804–1815
Kingdom of Prussia 1815–1871
German Empire 1871–1918
Weimar Republic 1918–1933
Nazi Germany 1933–1945
Allied-occupied Germany 1945–1949
West Germany 1949–1990
Germany 1990–present

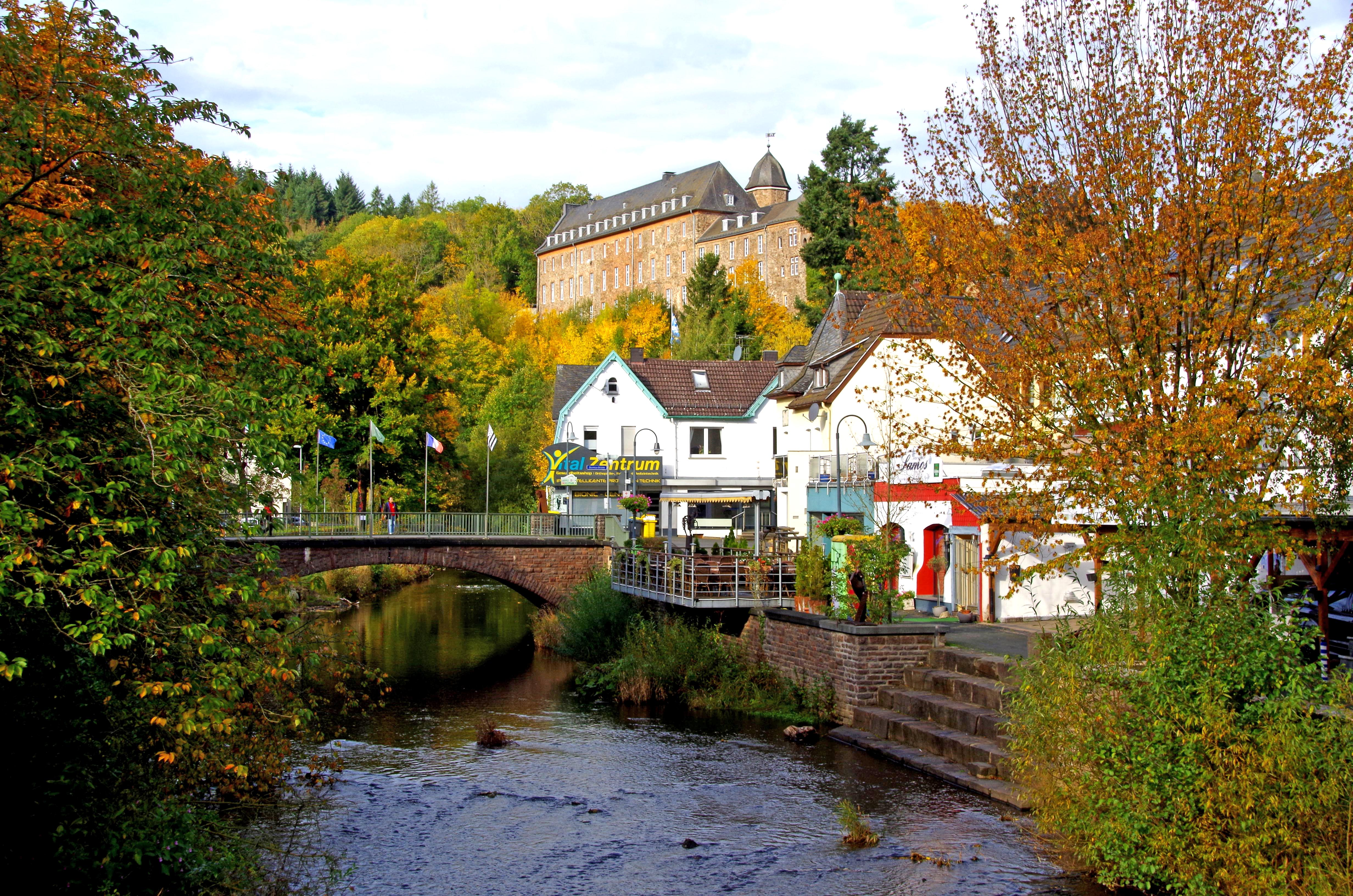
Schleiden

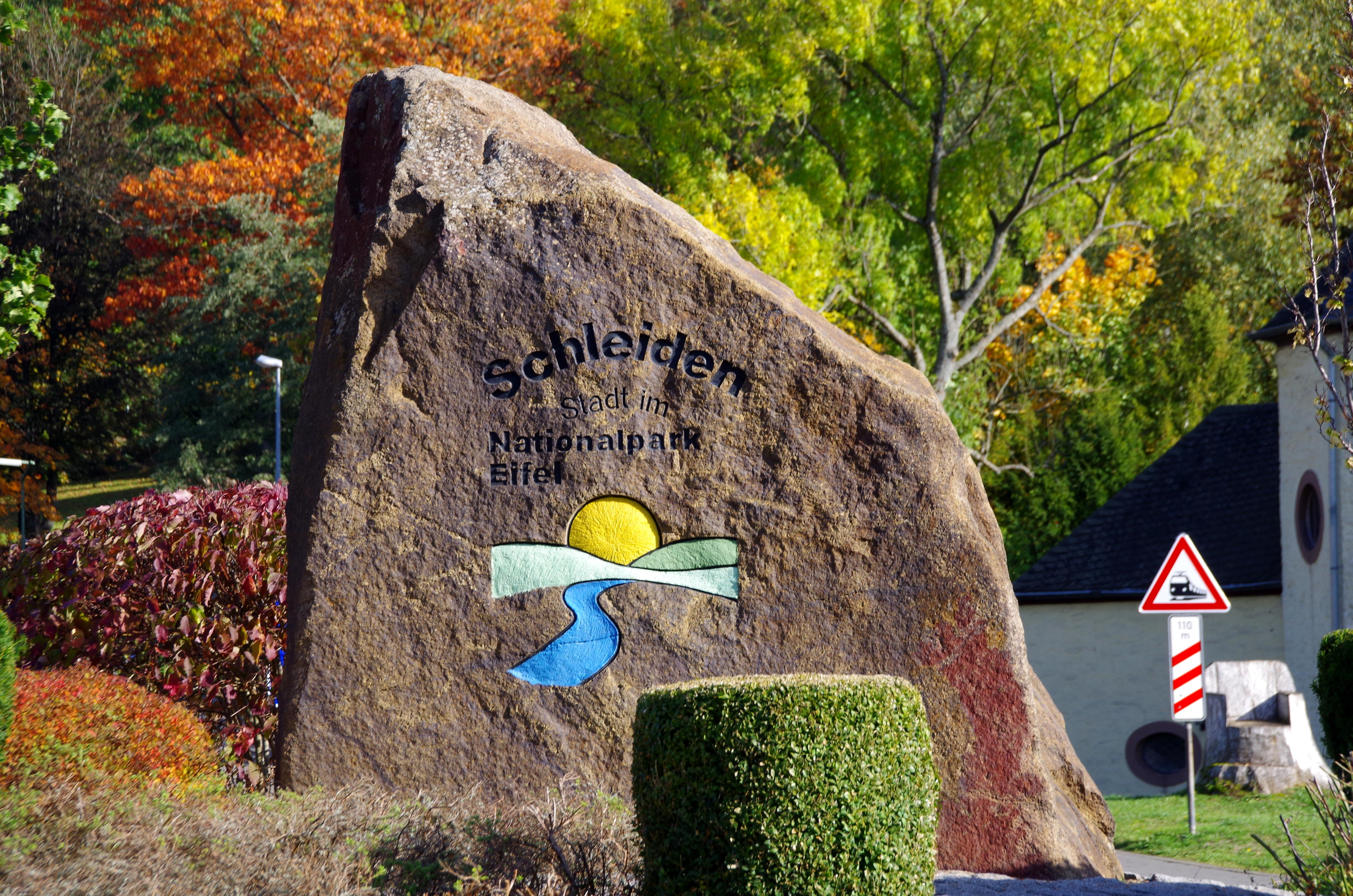
Schleiden, roundabout feature with national park logo

In the Middle Ages and early modern times, Schleiden was the centre of a lordship, later the County of Schleiden, which itself was part of the Duchy of Luxembourg, from 1441/43 as part of the Burgundian Netherlands (first under the Burgundians, then the Habsburgs). After the division of the Netherlands, the Duchy of Luxembourg with Schleiden remained as part of the Spanish line of the Habsburgs. After the War of Spanish Succession, the Duchy of Luxembourg, along with Schleiden, went to the Austrian line of the House of Habsburg. When revolutionary France conquered the Austrian Netherlands in 1794/95, the Duchy of Luxembourg was quickly divided into the three French departments: Forêts, Sambre-et-Meuse and Ourthe. Schleiden was in Ourthe (capital: Liege). At the Vienna Congress of 1815, the formerly Luxembourgian areas east of the Our, Sauer and Moselle rivers were given to the Kingdom of Prussia. Thus, Schleiden became "Prussian" and, in 1871, part of the German Empire after having belonged to the Duchy of Luxembourg for centuries.

The small town of Schleiden has produced two important Christian humanists: Johannes Sleidanus and Johannes Sturm, also known as Ioannes Sturmius.

In 1944 the Battle of Wahlerscheid took place nearby.

Schleiden had been affected by 2021 European floods. Nine persons in Schleiden died in the floods. Pedestrian zones in Gemünd and Schleiden main town, with commercial and residential buildings had been severely damaged.

== Population ==
Historical population

Year	Pop.	±% p.a.
1965	11,142	—
1970	11,652	+0.90%
1975	11,939	+0.49%
1980	12,342	+0.67%
1985	12,415	+0.12%
1990	13,011	+0.94%
1995	13,784	+1.16%

Year	Pop.	±% p.a.
2000	13,965	+0.26%
2005	13,857	−0.16%
2010	13,287	−0.84%
2015	13,272	−0.02%
2020	13,191	−0.12%
2025	13,390	+0.30%

Source: Landesdatabank Nordrhein-Westfalen

== Mayors ==
- 1972−1975: Max Fesenmeyer (independent)
- 1975−1984: Herbert Hermesdorf (1914–1999) (CDU)
- 1984−1995: Alois Sommer (CDU)
- 1995−1997: Dieter Wolter (CDU)
- 1997−2004: Christoph Lorbach (CDU)
- 2004−2012: Ralf Hergarten (independent)
- 2012–2018: Udo Meister (FDP)
- 2018– : Ingo Pfennings (CDU)

== Education ==
There are the following schools in the city:

- Municipal Johannes-Sturmius-High School
- Clara-Fey-High School, Schleiden (carrier is the diocese of Aachen)
- Municipal Secondary School
- Primary school
- Elementary school
- Elementary school Gemünd
- Elementary school Dreiborn
- Astrid Lindgren School, Schleiden

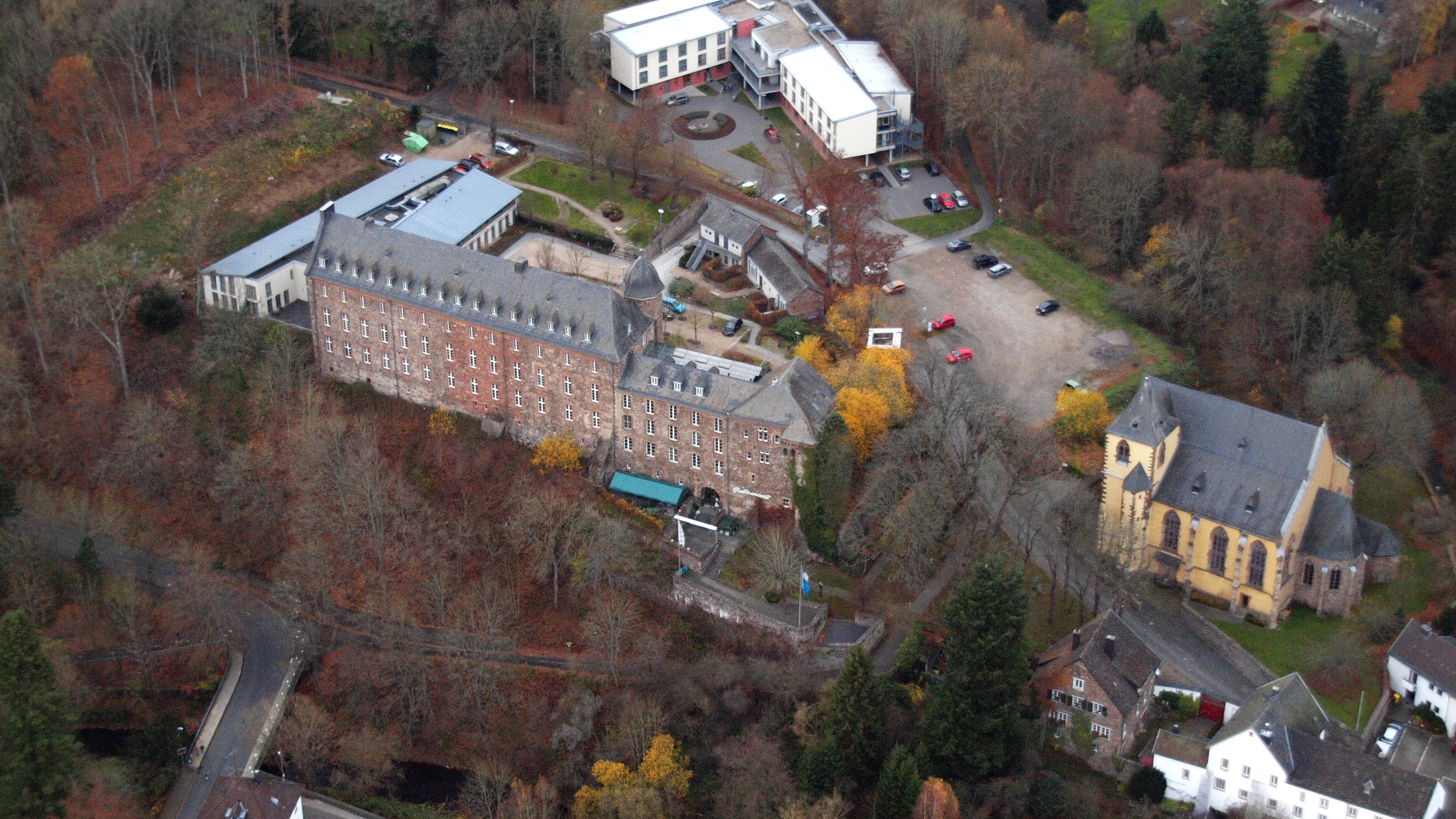
Schleiden castle aerial view

== Sights ==
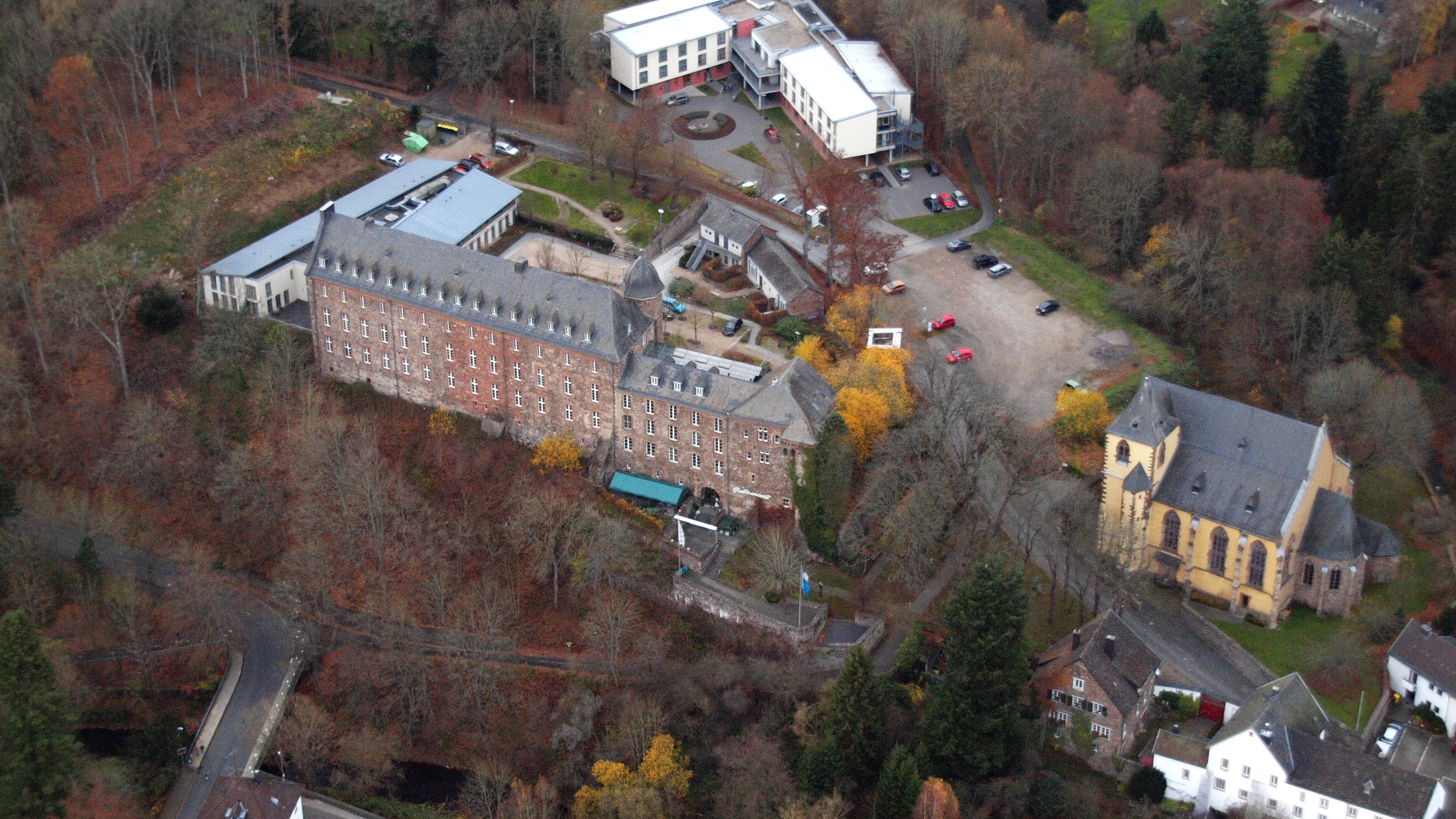
Schleiden Castle with its church, aerial view (2015)

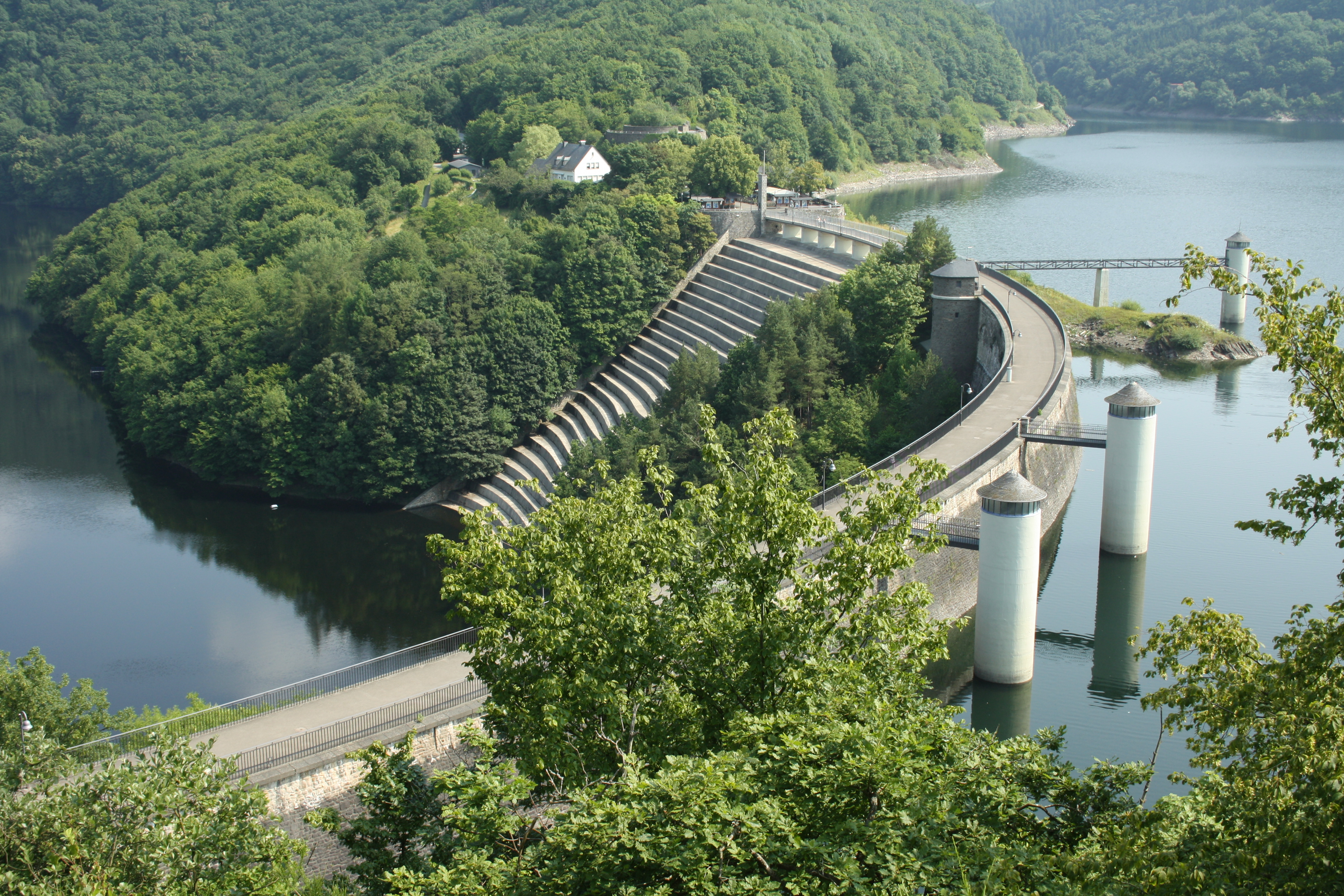
Urft Reservoir, aerial view (2009)

- Castle and church (1230 castle chapel, 1516–1525 late Gothic hall church, König organ from 1770)
- From 1900 to 1905 the Urft Dam was built as the largest dam in Europe at the time. Today it is part of the Eifel National Park.
- Ordensburg Vogelsang on the former Vogelsang Training Area
- "Tempelchen" war memorial for the victims of the Franco-Prussian War of 1870/71 and the First World War
- Jewish Cemetery
- Forest Experience Centre

=== Olef Valley Railway ===
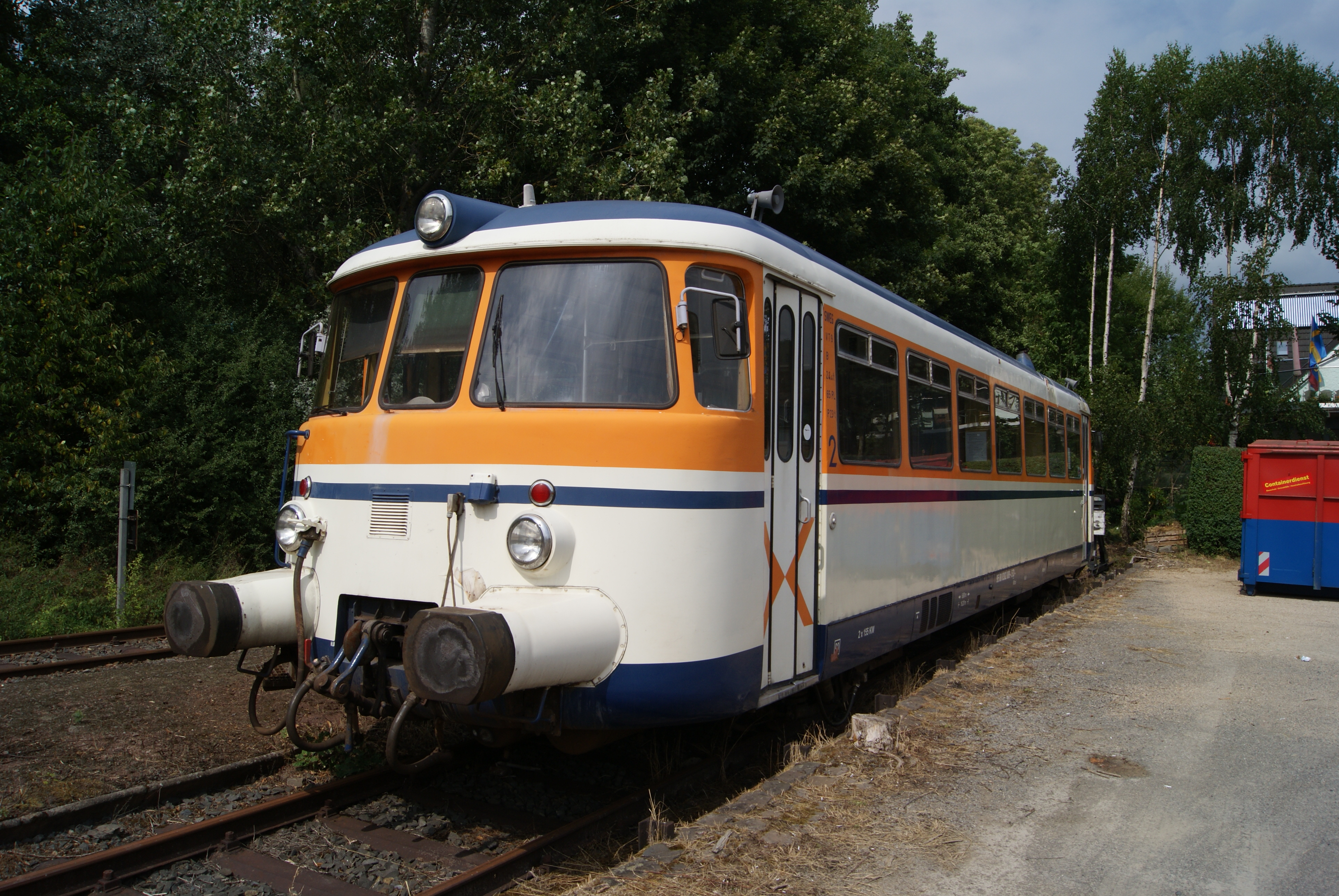
MAN railbus of the Oleftalbahn at Hp. Blumenthal

The Olef Valley Railway (from Kall to Hellenthal) stopped at Schleiden station; regular passenger services were discontinued by Deutsche Bundesbahn in 1981. Because of the Eifel National Park, which was newly established in 2004, the state of North Rhine-Westphalia is supporting tourism with a two-year programme of passenger services in the tourist season on Sundays and public holidays. These services terminated in 2004 in the district of Gemünd, and in 2005 they continued to Schleiden. The regional railway was managed by the Verkehrsverbund Rhein-Sieg; Rurtalbahn was the operator. Regular traffic ended on 16 October 2005. Since 2006 services have been operated privately as a museum railway in the summer season, with the 2008 season being operated by the Rhein-Sieg-Eisenbahn. From 2010, the trains will run again to Hellenthal station, using an historic MAN railbus. Due to massive damage caused by the 2021 European floods, museum railway services were suspended.

Until 1997 there was regular freight traffic via Schleiden to Hellenthal, after that only military traffic to Schleiden-Höddelbusch (tank loading ramp). The last troop loading took place there in winter 2002 with diesel and steam locomotives from a private railway. Belgium handed back the Vogelsang Training Area on 1 January 2006. The training area on the Dreiborn Plateau was turned over to non-military use and has a documentation centre and hiking area.

== Public figures ==
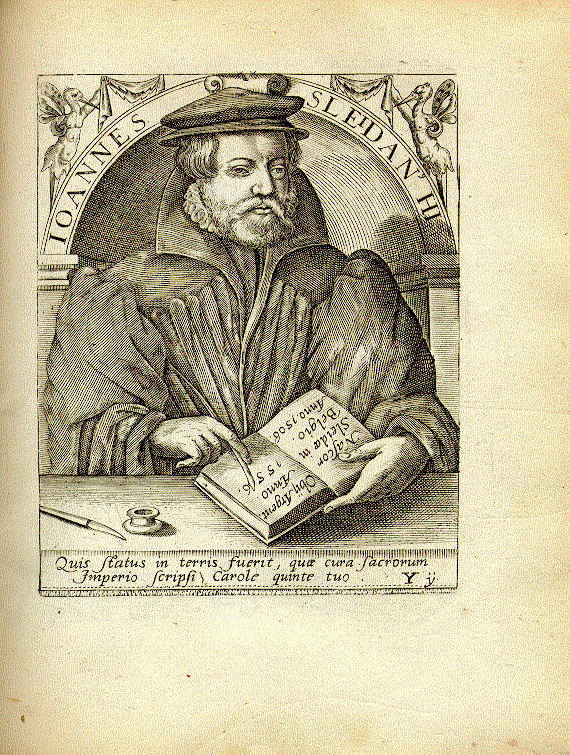
Johannes Sleidanus

- Johannes Sturm (Sturmius) (1507–1589), educator and scholar of the Renaissance, a professor in Paris and founder of the University of Strasbourg
- Johannes Sleidanus (1506–1556), historian, professor, Schleiden / Strasbourg
- Leopold Schoeller (1792–1884), industrialist and Privy Councillor of Commerce
- Gustav Poensgen (1824–1904), industrialist and Privy Councillor of Commerce
- Rudolf Poensgen (1826–1895), industrialist and councillor of commerce
- Carl Poensgen (1838–1921), industrialist and Privy Councillor of Commerce
- Larres Albert (1900–1987), painter
- Francis Albert Heinen (born 1953), journalist and nonfiction writer
- George Schreiber (born 1958), photographer
- Vera Hilger (born 1971), painter
