= Eggmühl–Langquaid railway =

Railway line in Germany

Service
- Route number: 12930

Technical
- Line length: 10.3 km (6.4 mi)
- Track gauge: 1,435 mm (4 ft 8 1/2 in)

The Eggmühl–Langquaid railway also known as the Schierling–Langquaid branch line (Lokalbahn Schierling–Langquaid) or Laaber Valley Railway (Laabertalbahn), is a standard gauge branch line in the state of Bavaria in southern Germany. It runs from Eggmühl to Langquaid and is operated by the Rhein-Sieg-Eisenbahn (RSE).

== History ==
The line was opened in 1903. Goods traffic was hauled by steam traction until 1964 and thereafter with diesel locomotives. In 1968 passenger services were withdrawn. In 1996 it was announced that goods traffic was also going to be closed down. However, in cooperation with a local initiative and local politicians, the Rhein-Sieg-Eisenbahn took over the Eichbühl–Lanquaid section from DB Netz on 1 January 2000. Five years later the section from Eggmühl to Eichbühl was added. Since 2001, goods trains have been hauled by a Class MV 9 locomotive built by Orenstein & Koppel, which had been purchased from the Zeil am Main sugar factory.

The goods facilities at Eggmühl, Schierling and Langquaid are served by the Rhein-Sieg-Eisenbahn in cooperation with Railion Deutschland using unit or block trains which are loaded up on loading sidings. On several Sundays and public holidays passenger trains are also laid on; details are given in the Deutsche Bahn timetable.

== See also ==
- Royal Bavarian State Railways
- Bavarian branch lines
