= Gemünd (Schleiden) =

- Village of Schleiden
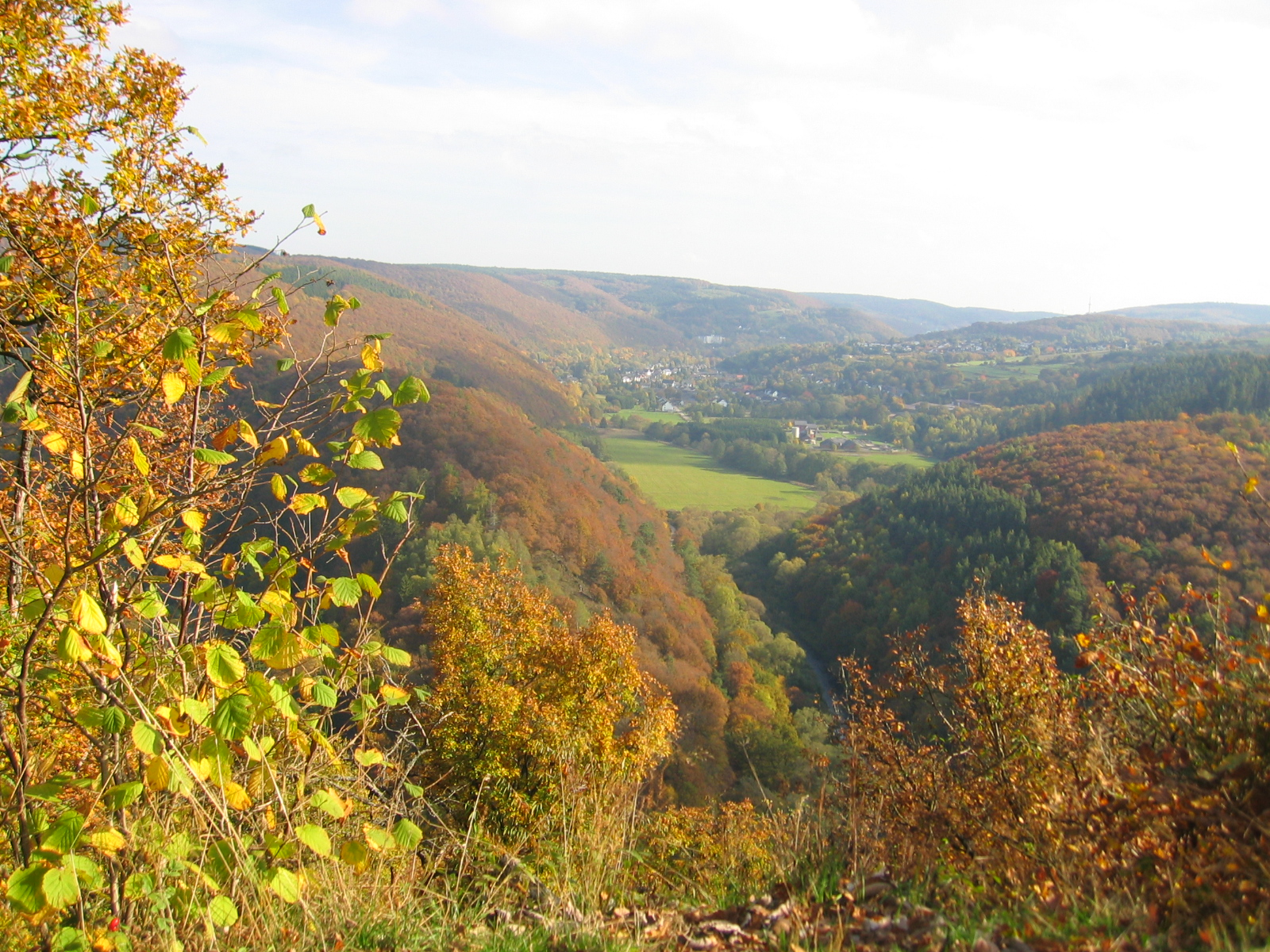
- Gemünd in the valley of the Urft (Autumn 2013)

- Coat of arms
- Interactive map of Gemünd
- Location within Germany Location within North Rhine-Westphalia
- Coordinates: 50°34′19″N 6°30′00″E
- Country: Germany
- State: North Rhine-Westphalia
- District: Euskirchen
- Town: Schleiden

Area
  - Total: 21.94 km^{2} (8.47 sq mi)
- Elevation: 339 m (1,112 ft)

Population (2021)
  - Total: 3,798
  - Density: 173.1/km^{2} (448.3/sq mi)
- Time zone: UTC+01:00 (CET)
  - Summer (DST): UTC+02:00 (CEST)
- Postal codes: 53937
- Dialling codes: 02444

Gemünd is a village in the Eifel region of Germany. With about 3,800 inhabitants it is the largest village in the municipality of Schleiden. It is also a well known Kneipp resort.

== Geography ==
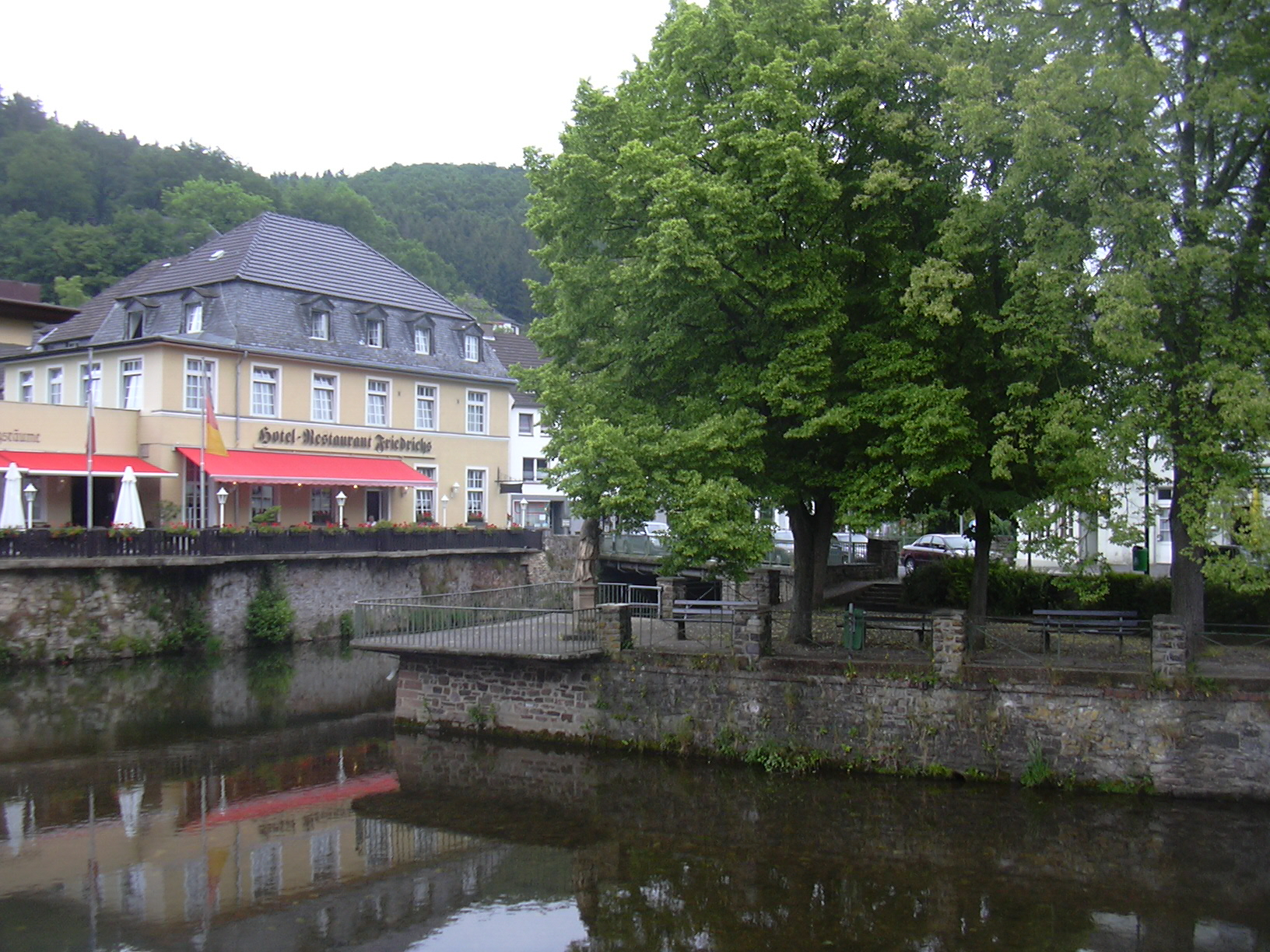
The confluence of the Olef and the Urft; Nepomuk statue

In Gemünd the Olef has its mouth on the River Urft; hence the origin of the name of the village (Mund = [river] mouth).

On the southern slopes of the Kermeter upland forest and east of the Dreiborn Plateau, the village of Gemünd is the southeastern gateway to the Eifel National Park; the other two gateways to this core zone of the German-Belgian nature park are Rurberg in the west and Heimbach in the northeast.

== Sights ==
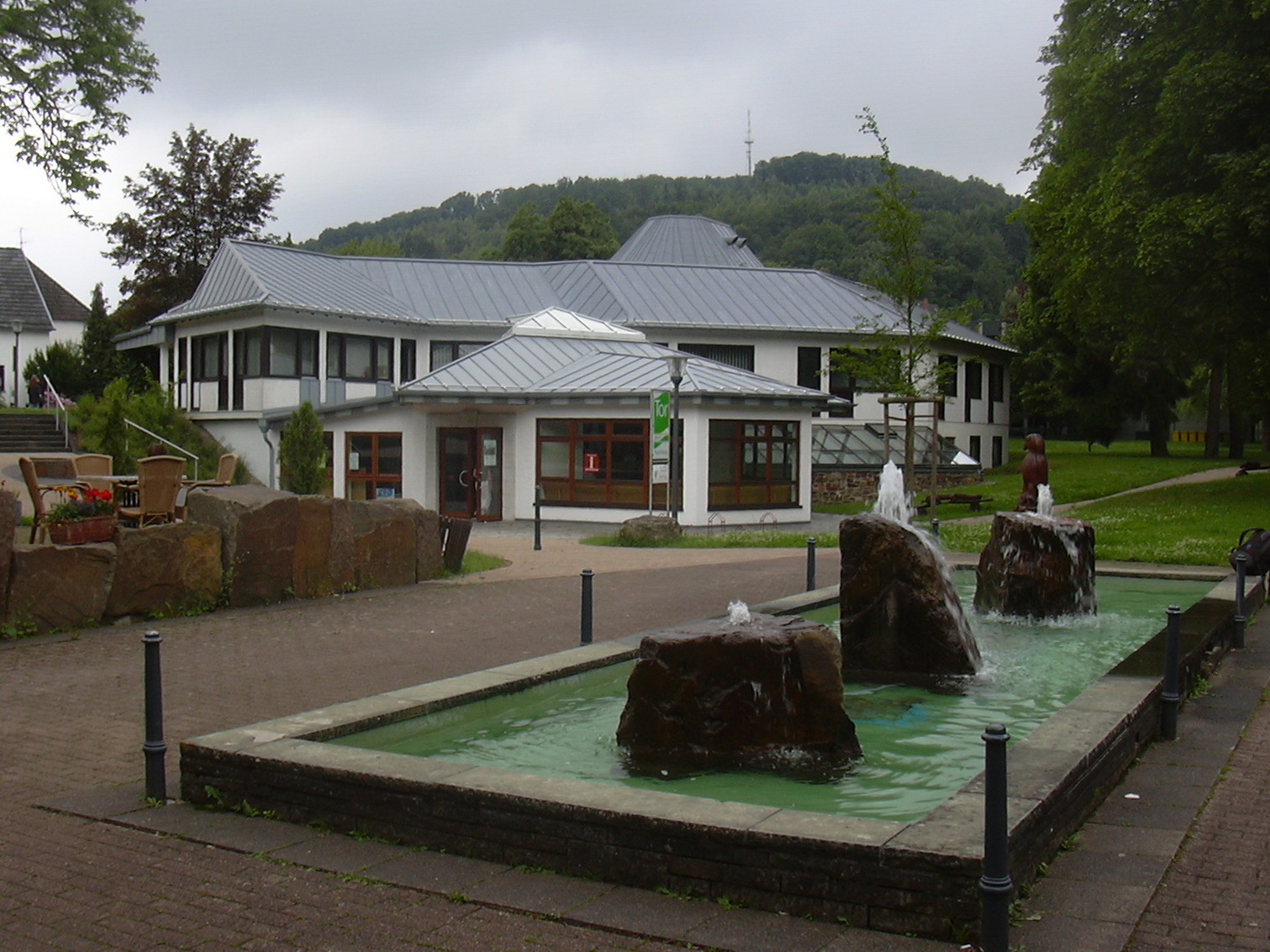
Gemünd spa house

Gemünd lies at the crossroads of the B 266 (Kölner Straße/Aachener Straße from Simmerath to Linz am Rhein) and B 265 (Luxemburger Straße/Dürener Straße from Cologne to Prüm) and on the confluence of the Olef and Urft. This point is marked by the Baroque statue of the patron saint of bridges, John of Nepomuk which was erected around 1730 and is made of red sandstone in the style of the bridge statues in Prague. It stands on a 1738 plinth with the Harff/Hoheneck coat of arms, and has been at this spot since 1859/60; before that it (or an older predecessor) stood on the Urft Viaduct which was replaced in 1734. Today, the original figure is in the spa house (Kurhaus); at its present site is a replica.

At the centre of the village above the river confluence to the north is the spa centre.

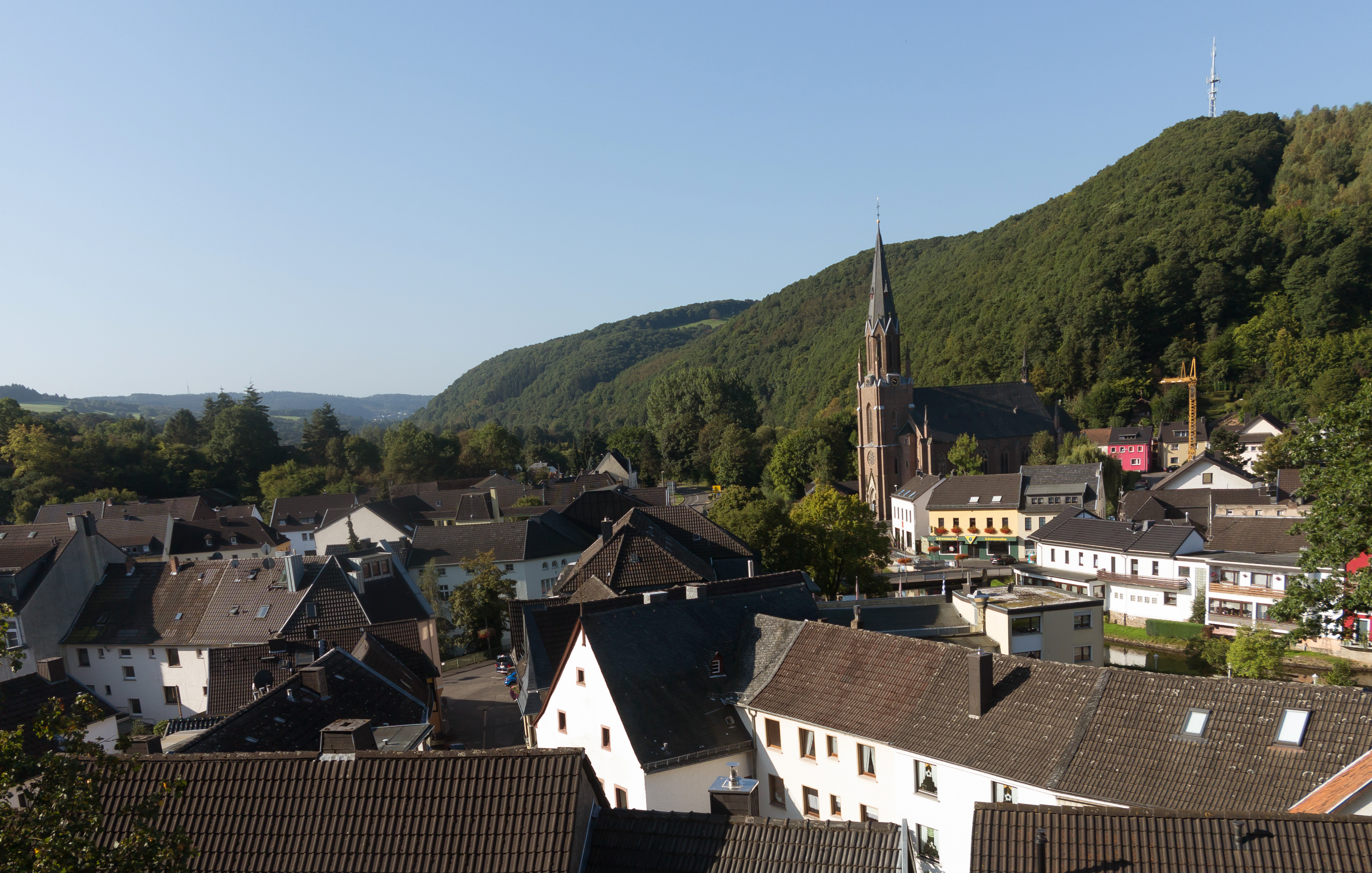
Gemünd, view of the village

== Literature ==
- Ruth Schmitz-Ehmke, Barbara Fischer: Die Bau- und Kunstdenkmäler des Kreises Euskirchen. Stadt Schleiden. Berlin, 1996.
- Wilhelm Günther: Gemünder Stadtgeschichte im Spiegel alter Bilder (=Heimatkalender des Kreises Schleiden.) Schleiden, 1968.
- Wilhelm Günther: Als Gemünd noch Kreishauptort war (=Heimatkalender des Kreises Schleiden.) Schleiden, 1965.
- Peter Neu: Eisenindustrie in der Eifel. Köln 1988.
- Ulrike Schwieren-Höger: Natur- und Kulturführer Nationalpark Eifel und seine neun Städte und Gemeinden. Gaasterland-Verlag, Düsseldorf, 2007, ISBN 978-3-935873-22-2.
- Ernst Wackenroder: Die Kunstdenkmäler des Kreises Schleiden. Düsseldorf, 1932.
- Hanna Wachtel, Lothar Braunisch: Schleiden-Gemünd. Stadt-Bild-Verlag, Leipzig o.J.
