= Battle of Heartbreak Crossroads =

Engagement prior to the Battle of the Bulge

- Part of World War II, Battle of the Bulge
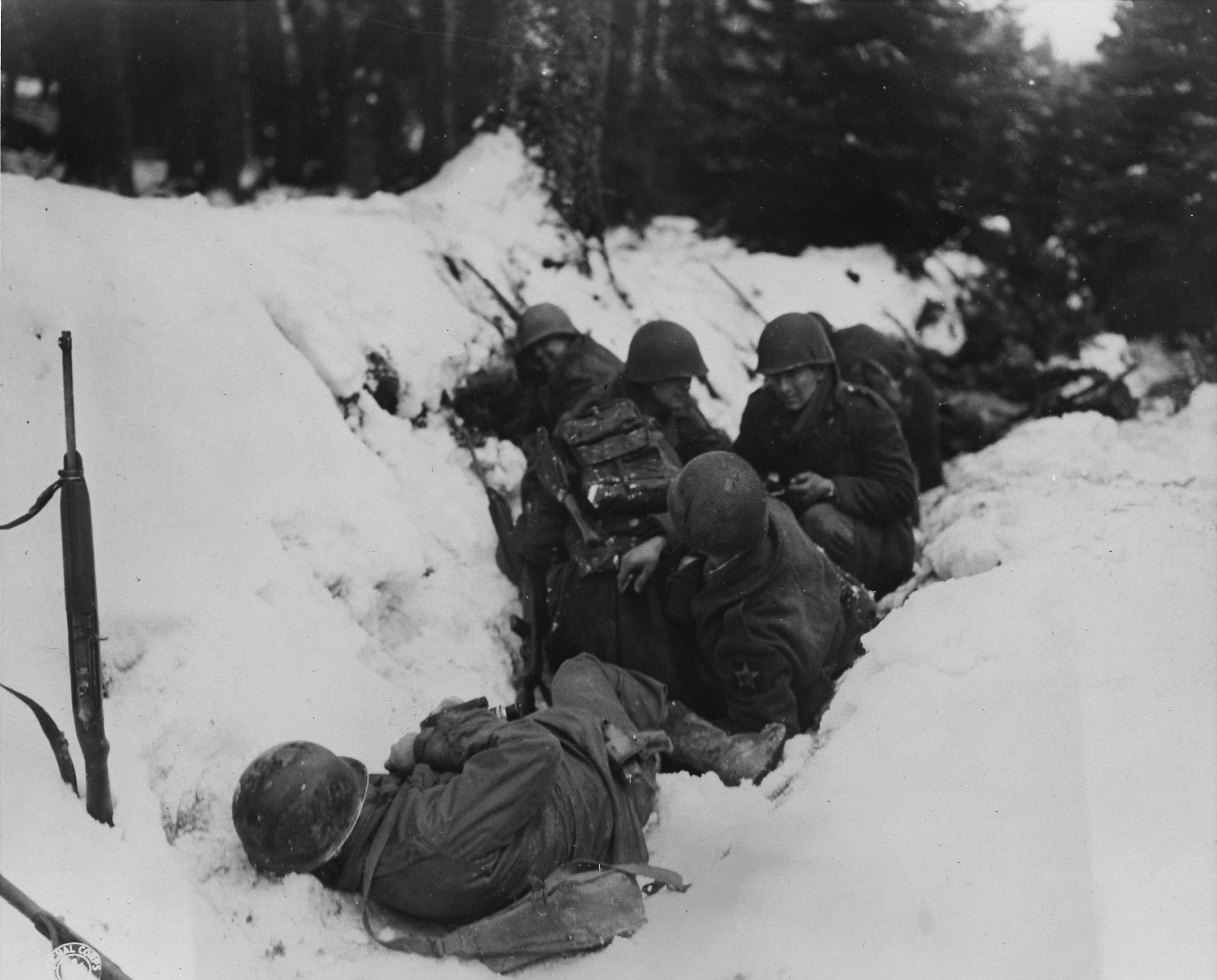
- Infantrymen of the 9th Regiment, 2nd Infantry Division crouch in a snow-filled ditch, taking shelter from a German artillery barrage in the Krinkelter woods on 14 December.
Date	16–26 December 1944
Location	Hellenthal region, Prussia, Germany 50°30′07″N 6°19′39″E
Result	Inconclusive

Belligerents
United States	Germany

Commanders and leaders
Omar N. Bradley; Walter E. Lauer; Walter M. Robertson	Sepp Dietrich; Hugo Kraas

Units involved
2nd Infantry Division; 99th Infantry Division	277th Volksgrenadier Division; 294th Volksgrenadier Division; 18th Volksgrenadier Division

The Battle of Heartbreak Crossroads was fought, beginning one day prior to the start of the Battle of the Bulge, at a vital three-way junction near a forester's cabin and former border post named Wahlerscheid, astride the Siegfried Line (Westwall). (Note: The interbellum Belgian-German border ran about one km to the southwest of the crossroads. The border post was, prior to the annexation of Eupen-Malmédy on 18 May 1940, the German-side customs house. After annexation it was integrated into the newly built Westwall defences around it.) The road ran along the Höfen-Alzen and Dreiborn ridges, about 5.6 miles (9.0 km) north of Krinkelt-Rocherath, Belgium. In early December 1944, the U.S. V Corps trucked the experienced 2nd Infantry Division from positions it had held in the south to Krinkelt-Rocherath, twin villages adjacent to Elsenborn Ridge and near the southern tip of the Hürtgen Forest.

On the eastern side of the Siegfried Line was an excellent road network leading to the Roer River dams a few miles to the northeast; the Allies' next goal. The Allies had tried bombing the dams without success, and a ground campaign was decided upon. The Americans were assigned to capture the crossroads with the goal of securing a jumping-off point for an attack on the dams, or failing that, force the Germans to blow them up. The dams were important to the Germans because they could be used defensively to control the flow and depth of the Roer River, delaying or even completely blocking Allied advances at will.

During the first two days of the battle, the Americans failed to advance and experienced significant losses. On the third day a platoon infiltrated the German lines and late on 15 December, the U.S. troops captured the crossroads. On 16 December, the German offensive threatened to isolate the Americans' rear areas, and they were forced to withdraw to the twin villages. The villages lay astride a key road that the Germans wanted to capture in their attack west towards Antwerp. This turned into the Battle of Elsenborn Ridge, which was the only portion of the Battle of the Bulge where the Allies did not yield to the Germans.

== Background ==
The Allies feared that once troops had crossed the river, the Germans might blow up the dams to produce flood waters that would isolate forces that had crossed the Roer. To prevent this, they sought to capture two key dams.

The 9th Infantry Regiment/2nd ID was ordered on December 7 to pass through the 99th Infantry Division and seize the road junction north of Höfen-Rocherath at the Wahlerscheid crossroads, attack north and capture Rohern inside the Seigfried Line, and then a hill 3,000 yards (2,700 m) east of the road junction. They would then advance east and seize a dam. The 38th Infantry was assigned to the main effort through the Monschau Forest toward Drieborn.

The sector along the northeast side of the road to Walerscheid was technically within the 99th Division's sector, but that division was stretched very thinly over an elongated front. Some areas had no fixed defensive positions, and were only covered by occasional jeep and foot patrols. That left a gap on the northeastern side of the road where the southeastward curve of the 99th Division's lines left the sector wide open to enemy penetration from the east. This prompted General Leonard T. Gerow on December 13 to order the 395th Regimental Combat Team (RCT), made up of two battalions of the 395th Infantry Regiment and another borrowed from the 393rd, to make a limited attack on the 2nd Division's immediate right flank against German positions about 1.4 miles (2.3 km) southeast of Wahlerscheid.

The 3 miles (4.8 km) of dense woods between Krinkelt-Rocherath and Wahlerscheid made accurate estimations of enemy strength difficult. The U.S. infantry were supported by the 612th Tank Destroyer Battalion, including a battery of 105 mm howitzers, another of 4.5 inch rockets, 155 mm self-propelled guns, a company of chemical mortars, a medium tank battalion, and two battalions of tank destroyers. This was reinforced by the 406th Field Artillery Group and their four battalions of 155 mm caliber or larger artillery. Combat Command B of the 9th Armored Division was attached to exploit a possible breakthrough.

An hour after sunrise on 13 December, the American infantry set off through the brush and thick woods on either side of the road, avoiding the mines known to block the road. The GIs were slowed by knee-deep snow in places, the dense, unfamiliar forest that dropped wet snow on them, and ravines full of melting snow that filled their boots. To avoid repeating the resupply difficulties encountered by the 28th Infantry Division in their battle further north near the Our and Sauer Rivers, Schmidt ordered his men to carry enough rations, ammunition, and antitank mines to last for at least 24 hours without resupply. Troops were carrying up to 120 pounds of gear.

== Geography of the attack ==
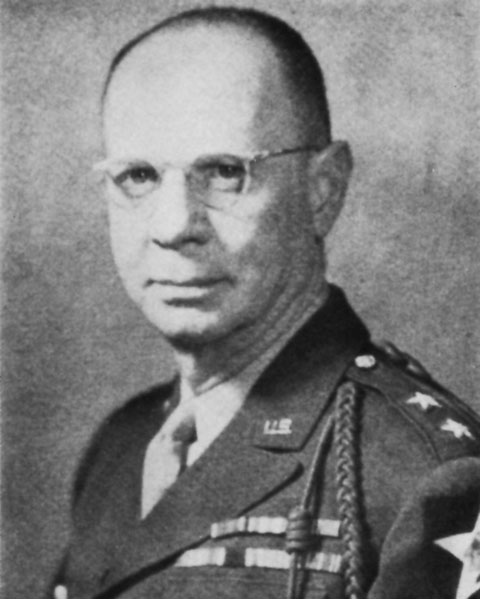
General Walter M. Robertson, commanding officer of the 2nd Infantry Division.

Two roads north of Höfen were important to movement through the area. In the north a main paved road led from Höfen through the Monschau Forest, then divided as it emerged on the eastern edge. The fork beyond the forest later gained some tactical importance.

A two-lane secondary road ran laterally behind the division center and right wing, leaving the Höfen road at the Wahlerscheid crossroads, which was guarded by a constellation of 25 concrete pillboxes. The Germans had cleared the ground near the crossroads of trees to give their troops a clear field of fire, and laced the area with antipersonnel mines and masses of barbed wire six to ten deep. It continued south through the Monschau Forest and the twin hamlets of Rocherath and Krinkelt, then intersected a main eastwest road at Büllingen.

On about December 12, the 2nd Infantry Division was brought to the rear of the yet untested 99th ID on Elsenborn Ridge and passed through their lines headed for the Wahlerscheid crossroads. The 2nd's commanding officer, General Walter M. Robertson, directed the 9th Infantry Regiment to attack along the only road, capture the junction, and then swing northwest to clear German forces along the Höfen-Alzen ridge towards Monschau. He ordered the 38th Infantry Regiment to attack northeast from the road junction along the Dreiborn Ridge, in the direction of the Roer River dams. The 23rd Infantry was held in reserve.

== Allies attack ==
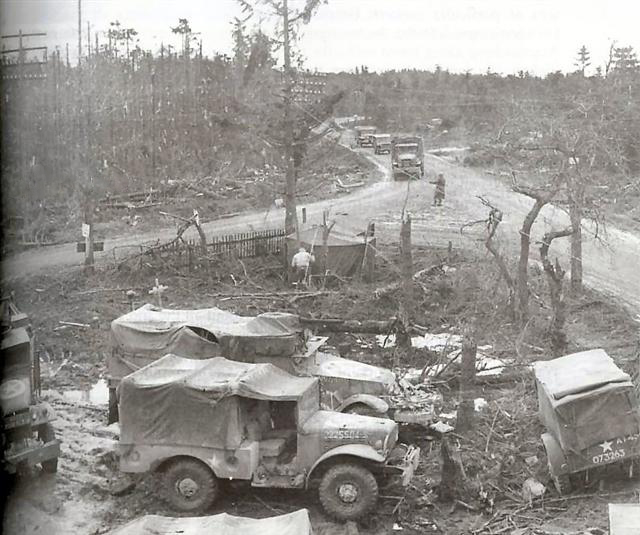
The intersection at Wahlerscheid on February 13, 1945 after it was recaptured by the 9th ID. The right road leads to Krinkelt-Rocherath, the left to Höfen-Alzen ridge and Monschau, and center into Nazi-held Germany, Dreiborn Ridge, and Roer River dams.

The 277th Volksgrenadier Division's 991st Grenadier Regiment and the 294th Volksgrenadier Division were in the Monschau Forest about 1.5 miles (2.4 km) southeast of Wahlerscheid. The 2nd ID intended to surprise the Germans and advanced without artillery preparation. Their movement forward through the forest went well at first with little resistance, but once they gained the edge of the cleared forest around the pillboxes on December 14, they found themselves facing four pillboxes, six concrete bunkers, a forester's lodge, and a customs house, grouped compactly about the road junction and sited to provide interlocking fire for their machine gun and rifle positions.

=== Germans prevent U.S. advance ===
The U.S. soldiers were met with concentrated fire from hundreds of German weapons. Shortly after the fire fight had begun a patrol from Company E wriggled out into the clearing for more than 80 yards to reach a slight elevation before the barbed wire barrier. (Note: Although not obvious due to the surrounding forest, the Dreiborn and Höfen-Alzen ridges join a few 100 metres/yards south of the crossroads to form the highest peak (655 metres (716 yd)) in this part of the Ardennes.) about 80 yards (73 m) from the edge of the forest. There the men were stopped by heavy machine gun fire. It was quickly discovered, however, that from this rise in ground a much better view of the pillboxes could be obtained than from the edge of the clearing. Word was sent back to the lines. Artillery was notified. Accompanied by two radio operators, Capt. Homer G. Ross, of Elyria, Ohio, Company Commander of Company E, crawled out in the face of enemy guns to join the platoon. From the middle of the clearing, he directed artillery fire by radio and succeeded in calling down direct hits on pillboxes. The patrol, however, could not breach the barbed wire, and, after the artillery mission had been fired, withdrew. The fight continued for two more days with little progress. On the first day, the battle for the crossing earned the nickname that stuck with it after the war, the Battle of Heartbreak Crossroads. The Americans pulled their troops back and called in American artillery, including the huge 155mm Long Tom cannon, which repeatedly targeted the pill boxes. The Americans tried to clear the waves of barbed wire with bangalore torpedoes but their progress was slowed by wet fuses.

=== Americans penetrate German lines ===
On the south side of the road, two U.S. squads crawling on their stomachs found a way through the well-emplaced German guns and cut the barbed wire to forge a path between the German defenses. They penetrated a trench line behind the pill boxes and held off German patrols for five hours, but when darkness fell they returned to the American lines. On December 15, an American patrol advanced once more through the breach in the barbed wire and captured a portion of the trench line. They alerted the regimental command post, and Lieutenant Colonel Walter M. Higgins, Jr., commanding officer of the 2nd Battalion, led two companies of GIs into the trenches behind the pill boxes. By the early morning of December 16, they gained control of several pillboxes, but did not have sufficient TNT on hand to destroy them. On December 16, the 9th Infantry Regiment pressed the attack another 1,500 yards (1,400 m) against stubborn resistance and captured the crossroads and the road network around it.

== Ardennes offensive ==
The U.S. First Army thought the Germans might initiate a spoiling attack to try to break up the U.S. drive. When the Germans launched a 90-minute artillery barrage on December 16, 1944, at 05:30, the Americans were only aware of what was happening in their sector. General Hodges remained convinced throughout 16 December that the counter-attack was nothing more than a spoiling offensive, as did General Omar Bradley at Twelfth Army Group HQ. Gerow called Hodges in Paris on the afternoon of the 16th to request permission to call off the attack on Hurtgen and reinforce the 2nd and 99th ID. Hodges said no. The 2nd ID continued to attack eastward throughout 16 December, but late in the evening they were told to hold their lines.

=== Americans break contact ===
When Bradley finally learned that the Germans had attacked the American lines in five places across an 80-mile (130 km) front in the Ardennes, he knew the Allies were in for a fight. During the morning of 17 December, elements of the 23rd Infantry Regiment, 2nd Infantry Division were attacked by a numerically superior force of German infantry and tanks. They repulsed the first six waves with heavy casualties, leading to a last ditch defense. Heavy machine gunner Richard Cowan was later awarded the Medal of Honor for single-handedly killing an estimated one hundred of the enemy before his unit withdrew. At 12:30 on 17 December, Gerow finally got permission from Hodges to break contact and withdraw towards the twin villages.

=== Withdrawal to Elsenborn Ridge ===
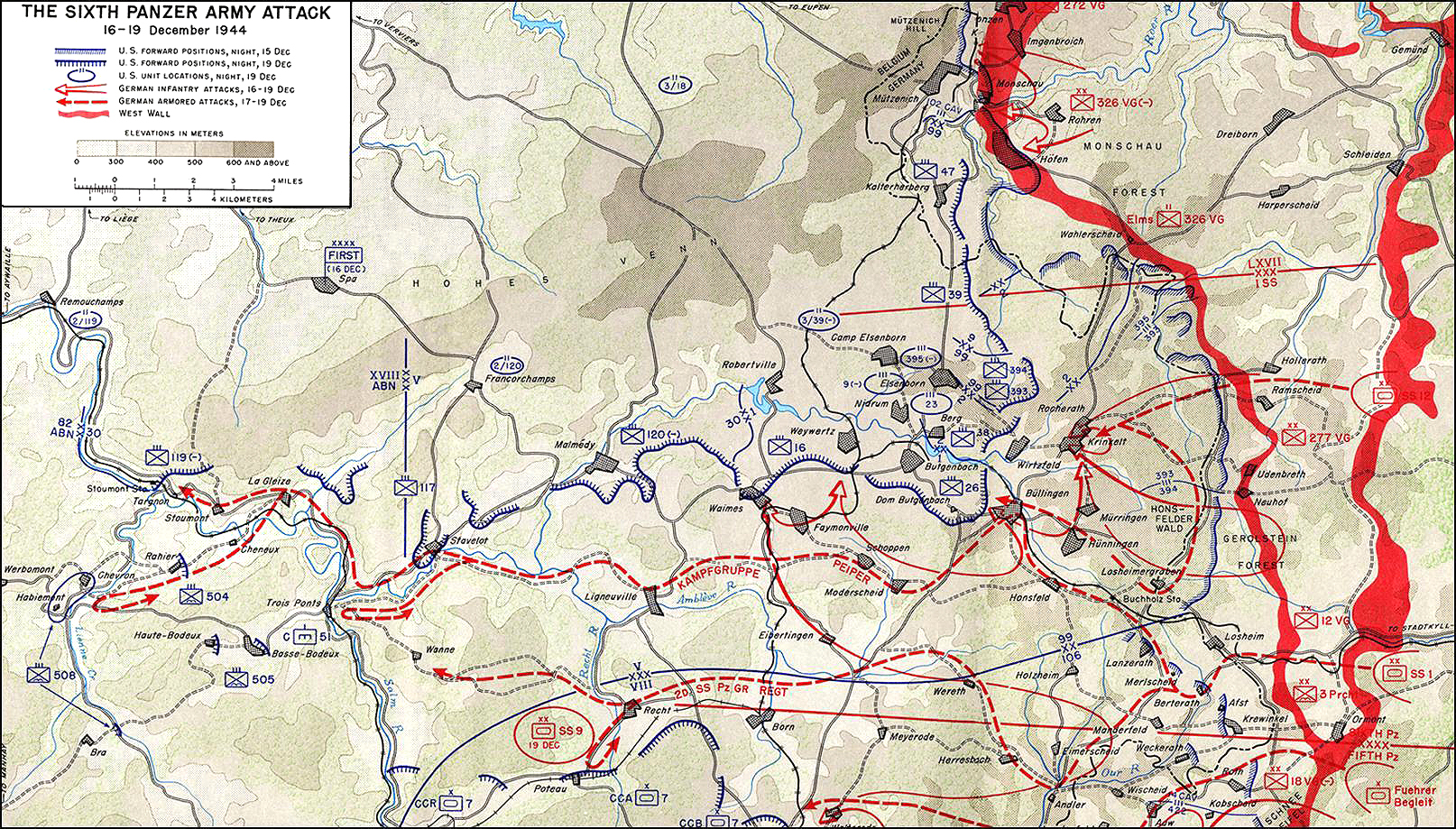
Northern shoulder of the Battle of the Bulge in which the German Sixth Panzer Army attacked the United States' 99th Infantry Division, but could not dislodge them.

During the night of 16 and dawn of 17 December, General Robertson consolidated his and other forces that had only a day before captured the vital crossroads at Wahlerscheid. To the east of Rocherath and Krinkelt, the Germans had made a deep penetration and were liable at any moment to come bursting out of the forest. The U.S. had to hold the twin villages to allow the 2nd ID with its heavy weapons and vehicles to reach positions around Elsenborn intact. The 99th Division had already put its last reserve into the battle. The 2nd ID with the attached 395th were left to defend the endangered sector of the corridor south.

The 9th Infantry Regiment pulled back to another crossroads in the forest at Baracken, about 5 miles (8.0 km) to the south of the cross roads at Wahlerscheid. The other units moved south through the area near the twin villages. Robertson moved his headquarters from Wirtzfeld, south and west of the twin villages, to Elsenborn, just west of the ridge line. Robertson also informed Gerow that he intended to hold the twin villages until troops east of the villages had retreated through them to the ridge line, which then would become the next line of defense. This defensive line was intended to safeguard the key high ground on Elsenborn Ridge from the German advance.

The Americans later regretted their failure to destroy the pillboxes at the crossroads when they were forced to recapture the area again in early February 1945.
