= Johannes Sleidanus =

Luxembourgish historian and annalist (1506–1556)

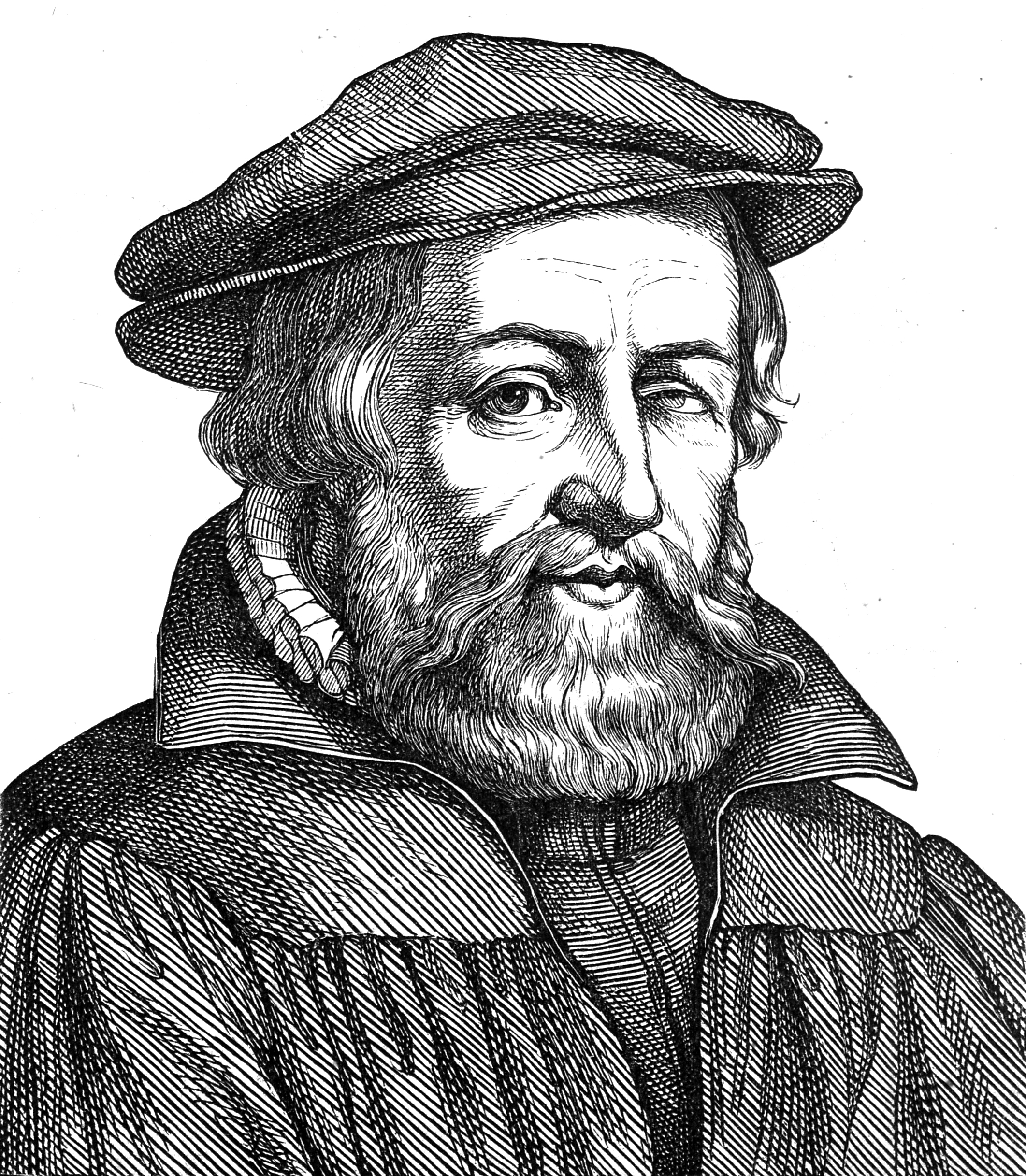
Johannes Sleidanus

Johannes Sleidanus or Sleidan (1506 – 31 October 1556) was a Luxembourgish historian and annalist of the Reformation.

== Life ==
He was born at Schleiden in the Duchy of Luxembourg, then part of the Habsburg Netherlands. He studied humanities at Leuven University and Cologne University, and law and jurisprudence at Paris and Orléans.

While among the Renaissance humanists of Leuven, he had adopted Protestant opinions, and entering the service of Cardinal du Bellay, was employed in the futile negotiations of the French court to make an alliance with the German Protestants against the Emperor Charles V. In 1542 he settled in Strasbourg.

Sleidanus had been accustomed to copy all papers bearing upon the Reformation to which he had access, and Martin Bucer, who had seen his collection, proposed to Philip of Hesse to appoint him historian of the Reformation, giving him a salary and access to all necessary documents. After some delay the heads of the league of Schmalkalden agreed to the proposal, and Sleidanus began his great work, finishing the first volume in 1545.

In that year he was recalled to diplomacy, and went to England in a French embassy to Henry VIII. While there he collected materials for his history. On his return he represented Strasbourg at the diets of Frankfurt and Worms, and went on to Marburg to explore the archives of Philip of Hesse.

The war of the league of Schmalkalden interfered with this work, and also prevented the payment of Sleidanus, who in his difficulties applied to England for aid, and at Cranmer's intercession received a yearly pension from Edward VI, which, however, was never paid out.

In 1551 Sleidanus went to the Council of Trent as representative from Strasbourg, charged also with full powers to act for the imperial cities of Esslingen, Ravensburg, Reutlingen, Biberach and Lindau. Soon afterwards he became a civil servant of the city of Strasbourg, and finished his great task in 1554, though lack of money and other misfortunes compelled him to delay printing. Sleidanus died in poverty at Strasbourg in October 1556.

The book appeared in the preceding year, Commentariorum de statu religionis et reipublicae, Carolo V. Caesare, libri XXVI.; it was translated into English by John Daus in 1560 and by G. Bohun in 1689. It was drafted with some care for impartiality, but this approach pleased no one, not even Melanchthon. It remains a valuable contemporary history of the times of the Reformation, and contains a large collection of documents.

== Posthumous ==
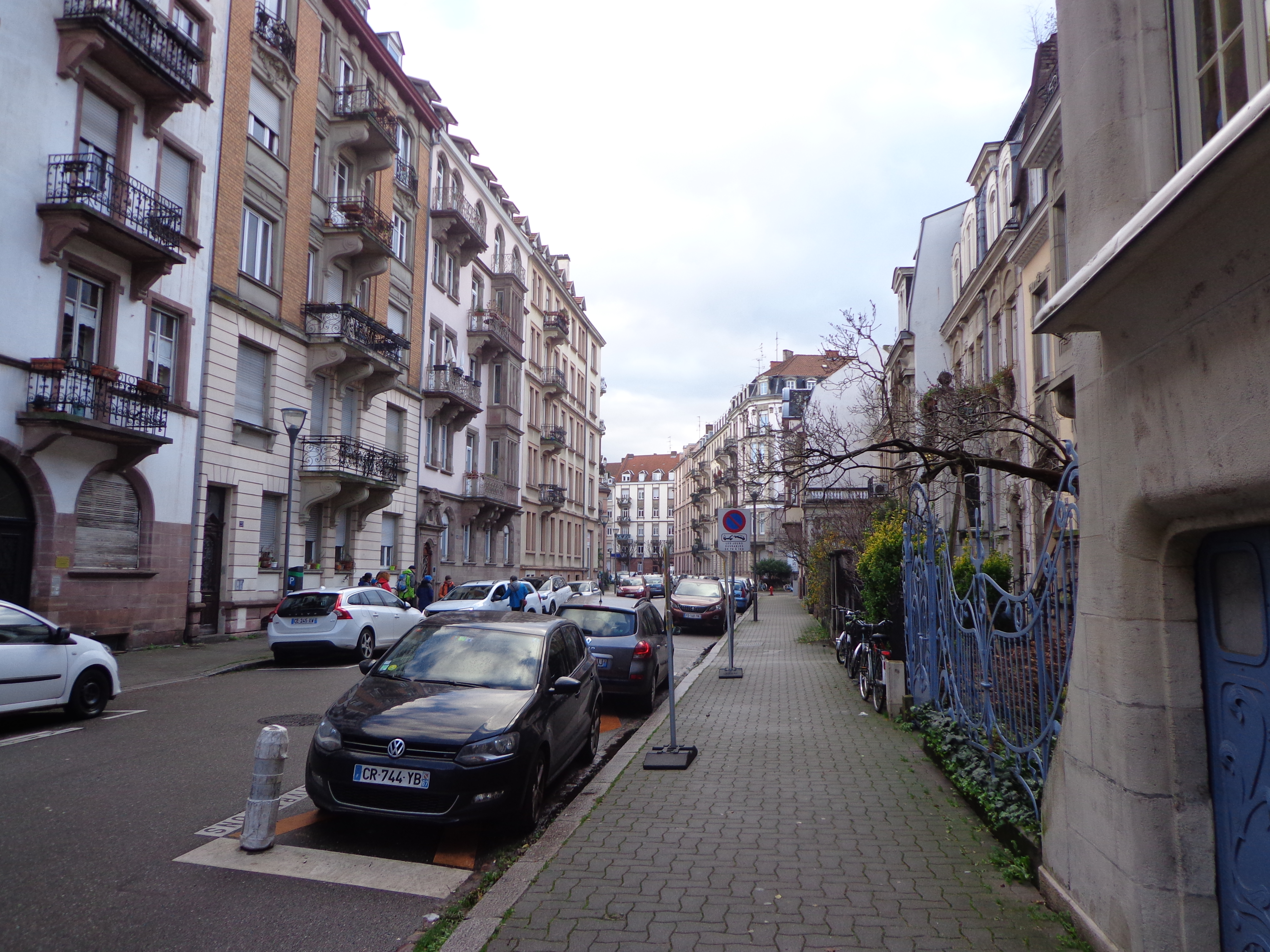
Rue Sleidan in Strasbourg

A street in the Neustadt district of Strasbourg is named after him (Rue Sleidan).
