= Vera Hilger =

German painter (born 1971)

Vera Hilger (born 1971) is a German painter.

== Life and work ==
Vera Hilger was born in Schleiden, Germany,

- 1991 - 1993 Vera Hilger studied Philosophy and German studies at the RWTH Aachen University
- 1993 - 1997 graduation from the Maastricht Academy of Fine Arts

After completing her studies in the Netherlands she moved into her main studio in the Belgian town Verviers, and a second studio at Cologne was retained.
Her paintings mostly focused the characteristic east Belgian landscape. The works did not reflect a realistic image, but they were deeply involved with the atmosphere of the landscapes.
From 2009, her paintings changed more and more by combining rhythmic elements and patterns with the depth in the picture plane and opened the way towards the now exclusively abstract painting.

Vera Hilger lives and works in Hauset/Belgium and Cologne/Germany.

== Selected exhibitions ==
- 2015 Into other Scapes, Museum van Bommel van Dam, Venlo (NL) | fuzzy sets, artothek Köln (D)
- 2014 Die Grosse Kunstausstellung NRW, Museum Kunstpalast Düsseldorf (D)
- 2013 edition norm, Barbette - Berlin | OSTRALE´013, Dresden (D) | Intervalle, Kirche St. Marien in Würselen (D)
- 2012 Kunstroute, Wanda Reiff, Bemelen (NL) | Prix Louis Schmidt, Musee d'art contemporain - Freie Universität Brüssel (B) | Pulsar, Bild für die Kirche St. Nikolaus (Citykirche), Aachen (D)
- 2011 exhibition celebrating the nomination to the IKOB Arts Award 2011 at the Museum of Contemporary Art in Eupen (B) | Vera Hilger - Works 2010/11, Gallery Freitag 18.30, Aachen (D)
- 2009 Gleam, Siegerlandmuseum-Haus Oranienstrasse, Siegen (D)
- 2008 grant at Starke Foundation, Artist in residence, Berlin (D)
- 2007 grant at Starke Foundation, Artist in residence, Berlin (D) | Gallery Geymüller, Essen (D) | Gallery Arcane, Liège (B)
- 2006 Sfumato, Raum für Kunst, Aachen | Landscape, Gallery Wolfs, Maastricht (NL)
- 2004 petit comité, Gallery Wolfs, Maastricht (NL)
- 2003 Walk, Gallery Wolfs, Maastricht (NL)
- 2002 Gallery Wolfs, Maastricht (NL)
- 2001 Gallery Pin, Bielefeld (D)
- 2000 Gallery Cave Canem, Aachen (D)
- 1999 Gallery Cave Canem, Aachen (D)
- 1997 Graduates' exhibition Akademie Of Arts Maastricht
- 1995 Gallery van Laethem, Hasselt (group exhibition)

== Awards and scholarships ==
- 2011 nomination for the IKOB Arts Award 2011, Eupen (B)
- 2008 Artist in residence, grant at Starke Foundation, Berlin (D)
- 2007 Artist in residence, grant at Starke Foundation, Berlin (D)

== Catalogues and editions ==
- Gleam, publisher: Siegerlandmuseum, Siegen, 2009
- Sfumato, publisher: Raum für Kunst, Aachen 2006
- Walk, publisher: Gallery Wolfs, Maastricht 2003
