= Olef Valley Railway =

Railway line in Germany

Kall–Hellenthal
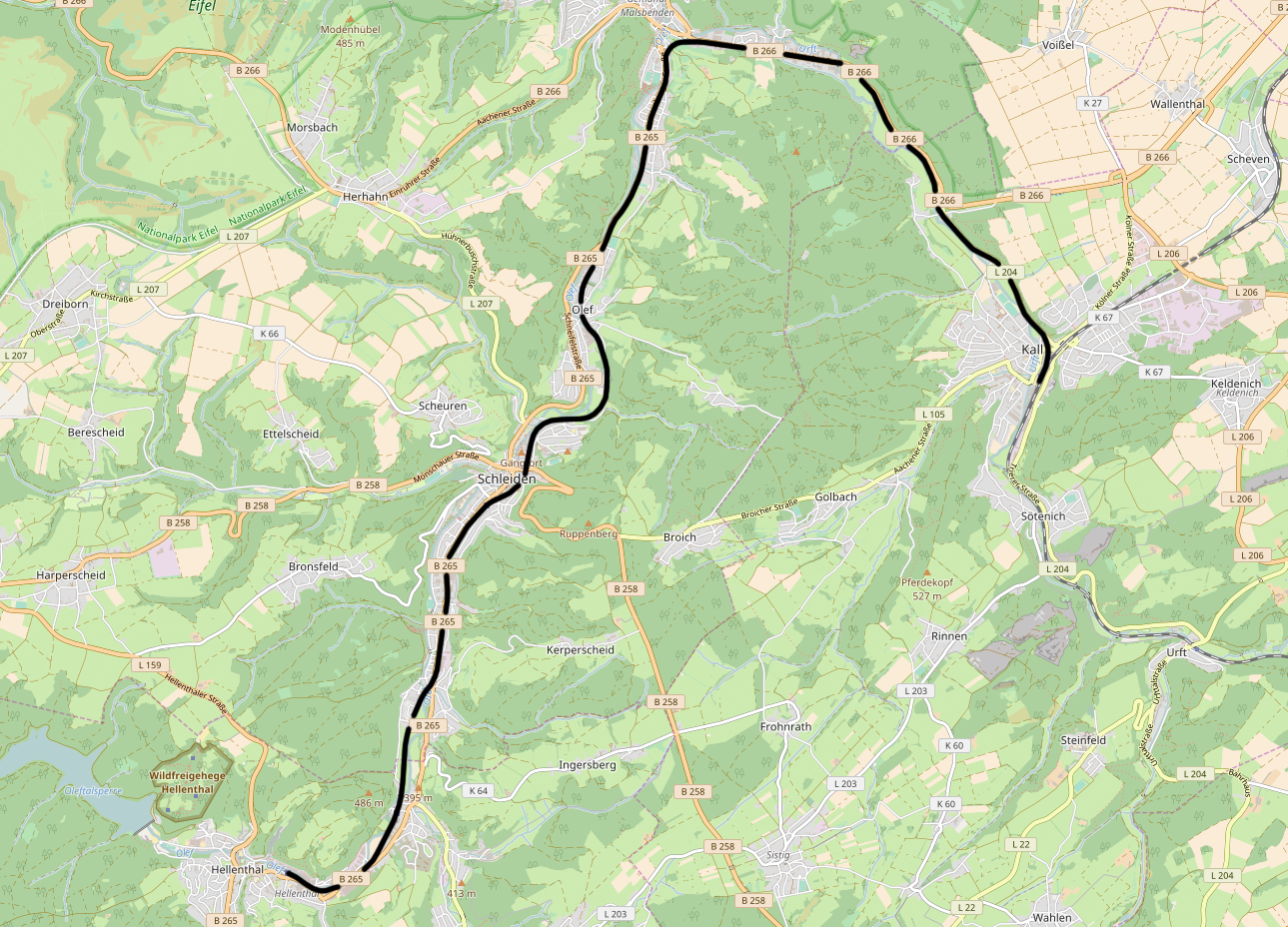
- Route of the Olef Valley Railway

Overview
- Line number: 2635

Service
- Route number: 432

Technical
- Line length: 17.8 km (Line class: CE)
- Track gauge: 1435 mm

The Olef Valley Railway (German: Oleftalbahn or Flitsch) or OTB is a 17.8-kilometre-long, single tracked, unelectrified branch line from Kall through the Schleiden Valley above Schleiden to Hellenthal. The line is currently used by tourists; travelling on the heritage railway in the summer months or occasionally by goods trains. However, there are attempts to reactivate passenger services that were ceased in 1981.

== Literature ==
- Bernd Franco Hoffmann: Stillgelegte Bahnstrecken im Rheinland. Sutton-Verlag, Erfurt, 2014, ISBN 978-3-95400-396-9.
