= Bundesstraße 258 =

Federal highway in Germany

B 258
- Bundesstraße 258
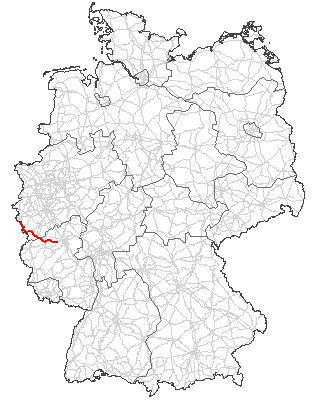

Route information
- Length: 166 km (103 mi)

Major junctions
- Northwest end: Aachen
- Southeast end: Mayen

Location
- Country: Germany
- States: North Rhine-Westphalia, Rhineland-Palatinate

Highway system
- Roads in Germany; Autobahns; List; Federal; List; State; E-roads

The Bundesstraße 258 is a German federal highway. It starts in Aachen, crosses the Eifel from northwest to southeast and ends in Mayen.

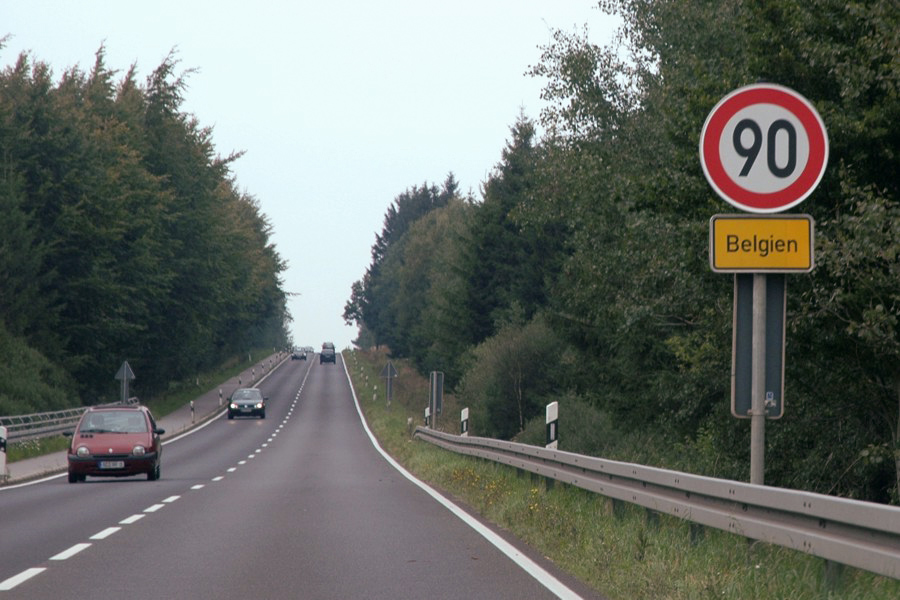
Border crossing at Roetgen. A small sign reading Belgien (Belgium) is the only notice that one has left German territory.

From Aachen, the road first runs south along the Belgian border. One curiosity on this part is a 3 km long strip at Roetgen where the German federal highway leads through Belgian territory. This strip has no connection to the Belgian road network, and the only notice of the border crossing is a small sign reading Belgien (Belgium in German). There is one house along this strip of road, which has a Belgian post code, but is connected to the German telephone network.

After that, the road runs through Monschau and Schleiden. From Blankenheim the road follows the river Ahr downstream until it leaves the river at Müsch. The road then passes beneath the Nürburgring and reaches its end south of Mayen. Originally, the road went further to the city of Koblenz, but this strip has been downgraded due to the nearby Bundesautobahn 48.

Since 2010 the road has been running from the Relais Königsberg via the Monschauer Straße at Aachen-Lichtenbusch to the Bundesautobahn 44.
