= Dreiborn Plateau =

Coordinates: 50°33′48″N 6°24′59″E

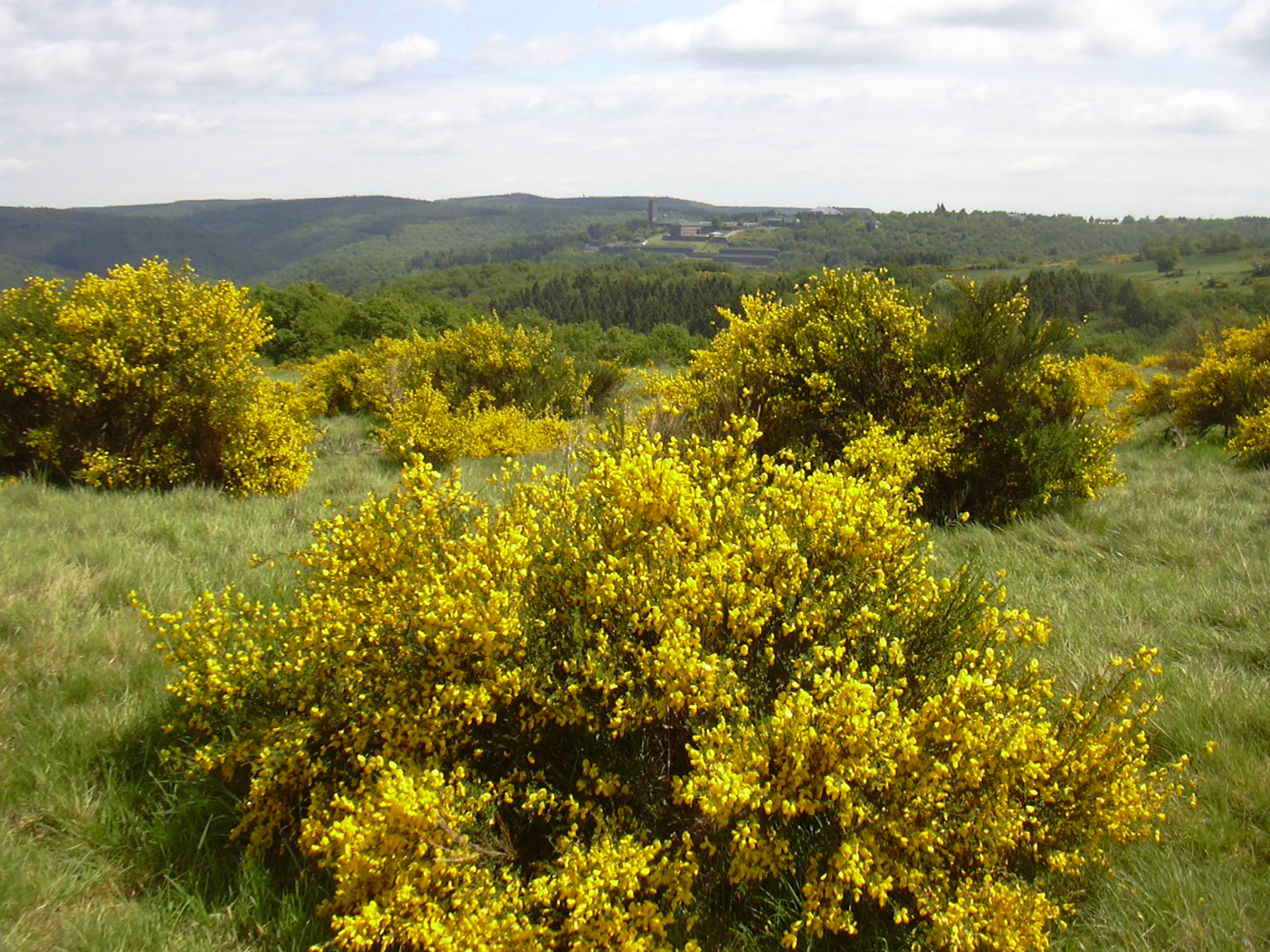
On the footpath over the Dreiborn Plateau from Wollseifen to the Urft Dam: view of the former Ordensburg Vogelsang and the Kermeter upland forest

The Dreiborn Plateau (German: Dreiborner Hochfläche) is an area of woods and open terrain, some 33 square kilometres in area, in the Eifel National Park. It corresponds to the area of the Vogelsang Military Training Area which was handed back on 31 December 2005 and had been out-of-bounds to the public since 1 September 1946. Since 2006 parts of the area have been opened up to the public who may use certain routes through it.

== Location and geography ==
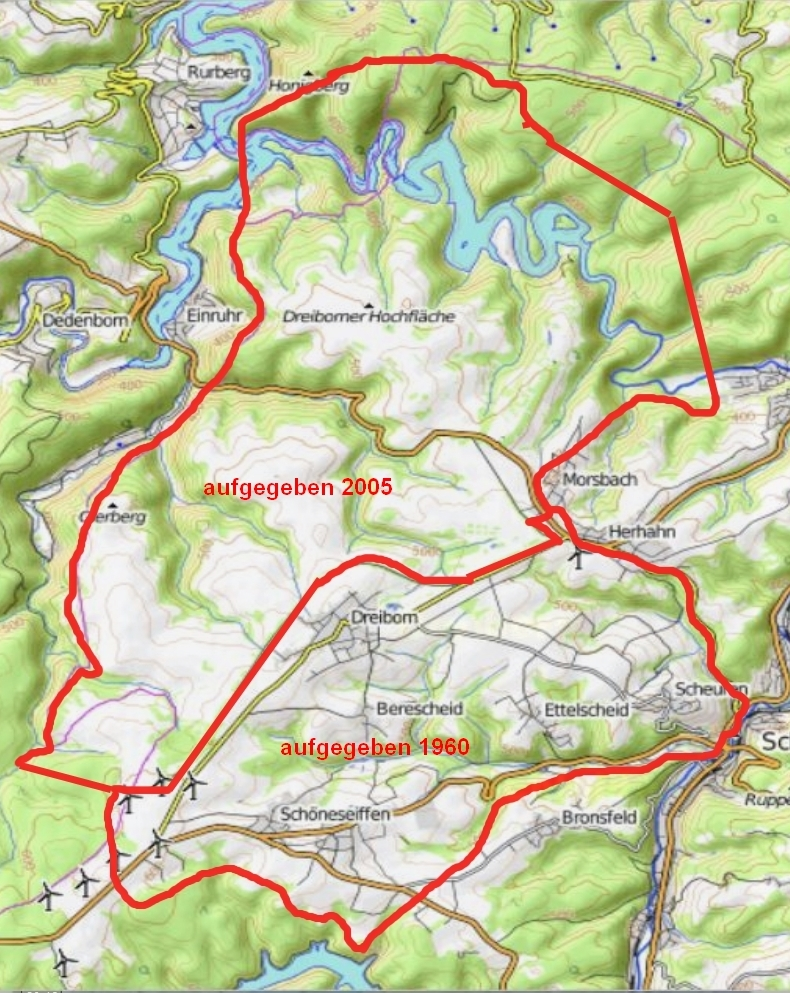
Vogelsang Military Training Area

The Dreiborn Plateau is bordered in the west by the Obersee and Einruhr, the river and village of Erkensruhr, in the south by the L 207 state road through Dreiborn and Herhahn, in the east by the terrain around the former Nazi fort of Ordensburg Vogelsang with the valleys of the Neffgesbach and Morsbach, in the north by the Urft valley and the Urftsee lake, which separates the Dreiborn Plateau from the ridge of the Kermeter to the north.

The plateau is bisected in an east to west direction by the B 266 federal road along the Sauerbach stream, on which is located the so-called Heilsteinquelle ("Healing Stone Spring"), rediscovered in 1863 and probably used as early as Roman times. The B 266 divides the plateau into northern and southern halves. A rise at 517 metres (so-called Drei-Täler-Blick or "Three Valleys View"), Kellenberg and the ghost village of Wollseifen are accessible on paths in the northern half; the hills of Klusenberg, Gierberg and Müsauelsberg, at 577 metres the highest point, lie in the southern section.

== Nature, flora and fauna ==
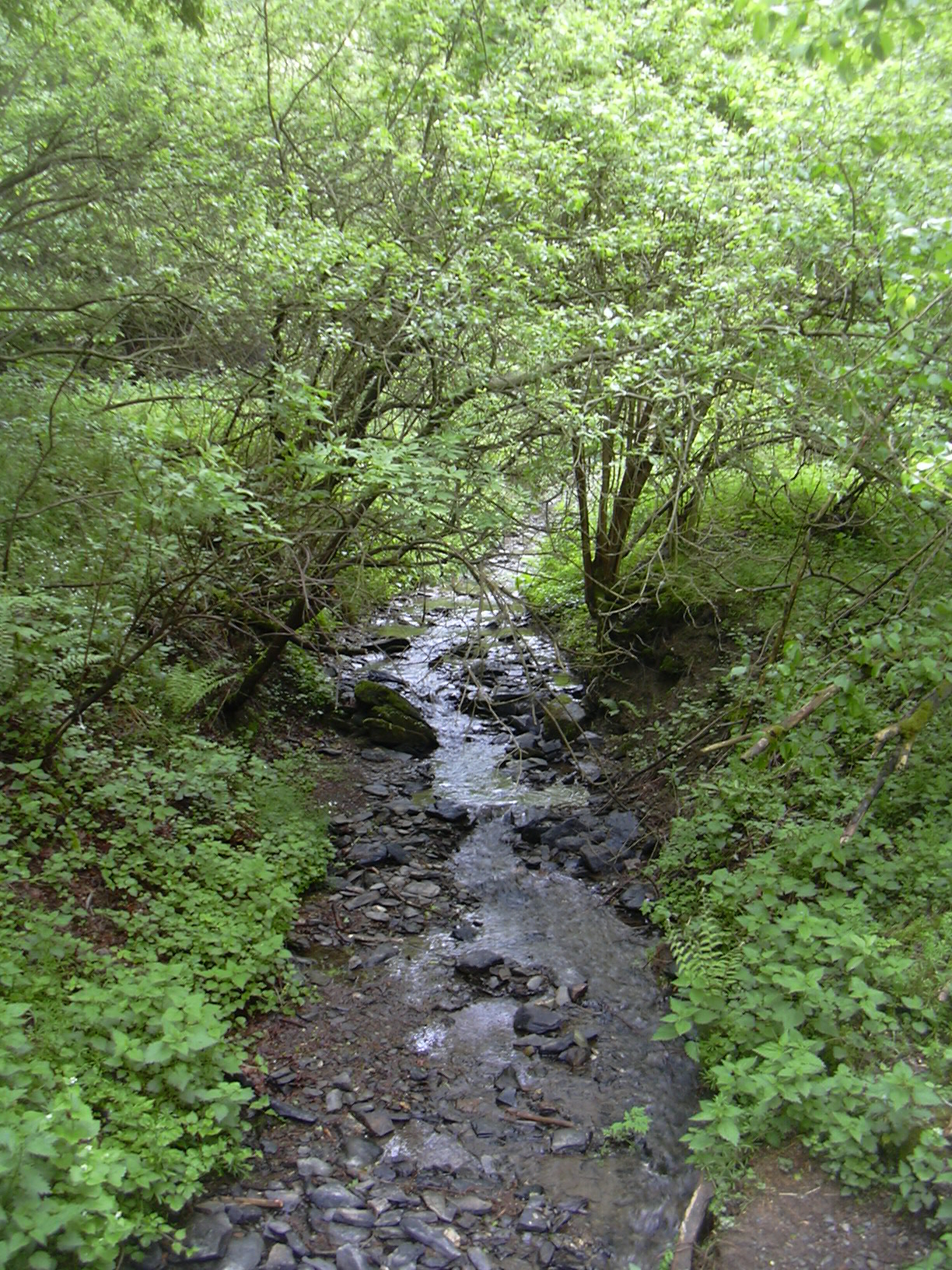
Ancient forest on the Neffgesbach stream (eastern boundary of the Dreiborn Plateau)

Thick beech, oak and spruce woods surround the streams and reservoirs at a height of about 350 metres, that border the Dreiborn Plateau. These woods climb steeply from the valley sides to the high plateau 500 metres above the valley floor. The woods were not managed for almost 60 years, whilst the terrain was used as a military training area, and, as a result, large tracts have reached a natural state similar to that of ancient forests in which old and dead trees have not been cut or cleared. The preservation of this natural forest as a habitat for, in some cases rare, species of animal like the European wildcat, and the establishment of specially protected zones around breeding colonies of cormorant, grey heron and black stork are aims that the National Park authority has set itself.

The open terrain of the plateau, which was used for agriculture and sheep-grazing before the establishment of the training area in 1946 and was thus a cultural landscape, is dominated today by the broad grasslands of the Ginster, which is a popular tourist attraction during its blossom time in May. The National Park authority is still working out whether and to what extent this open countryside can and should be preserved as a former cultural landscape, in order to maintain the views and to enable visitors to see red deer that are active during the day at specially selected sites, such as observation platforms.

To leave the land to itself would, over time, normally result in the encroachment of bushes and reforestation of those areas. Although the deer will create a few clearings, the natural supply of food is not enough to keep larger areas permanently open. Plans to support the maintenance of open land by introducing red deer and wild boar, both of which occur naturally in the Eifel, as well as bison, elk and fallow deer, alongside red deer, were discarded because of the risk that the harsh winter climate would have driven these animals into the valleys, where they might pose a safety hazard to people as they would be too close to the villages. With fencing the animals could certainly be kept up high, but that would mean an outdoor enclosure, which is contrary to the concept of a national park, which has to set aside 75% of its area as undisturbed wilderness, and only 25% of the area may be managed in order to achieve a specific human aim.

Out of the conflicting views, it appears likely in the early 21st century that the Dreiborn Plateau will be allowed to become largely reforested over the coming generations.

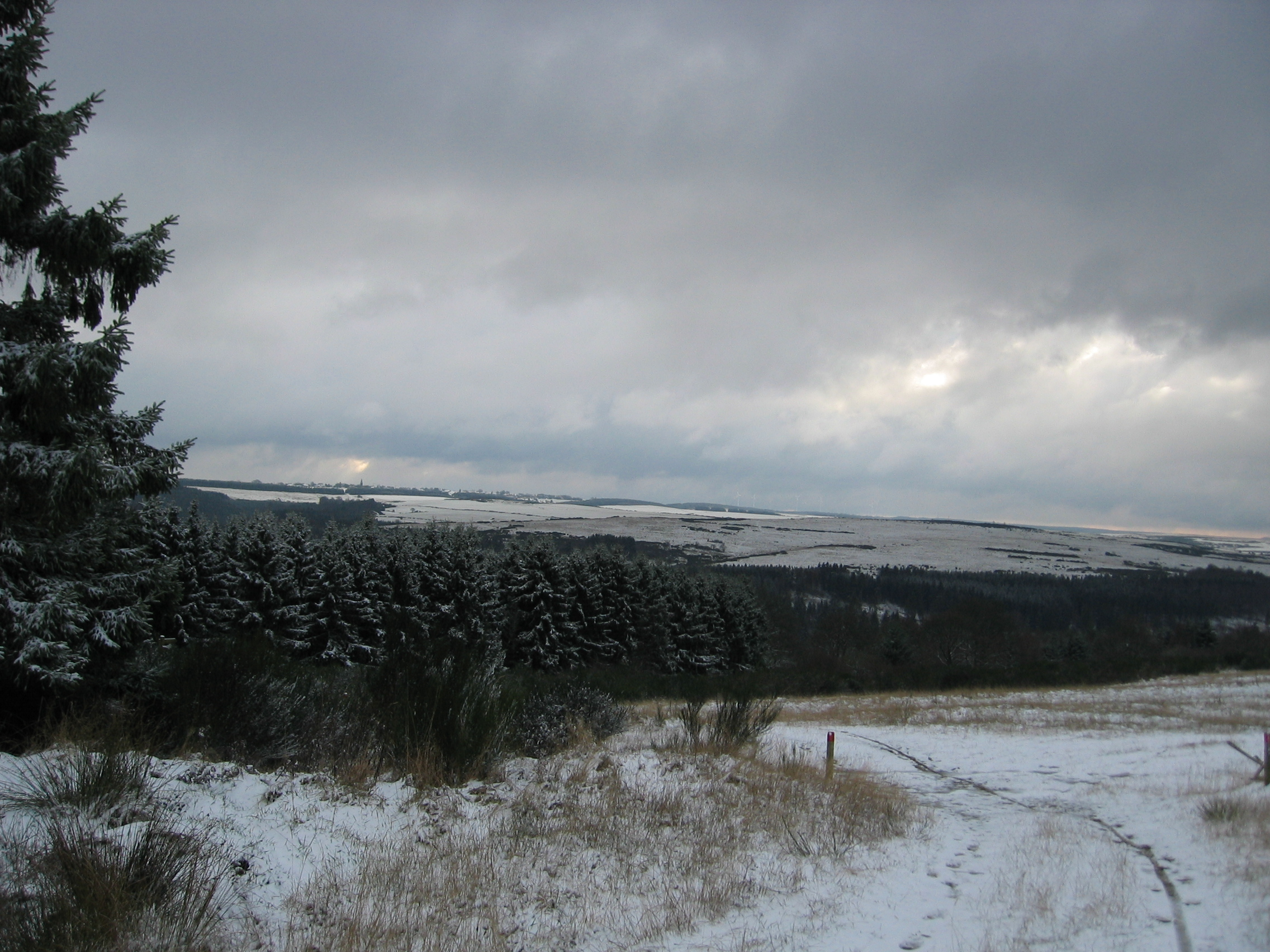
Dreiborn Plateau in December 2009

== Tourism ==
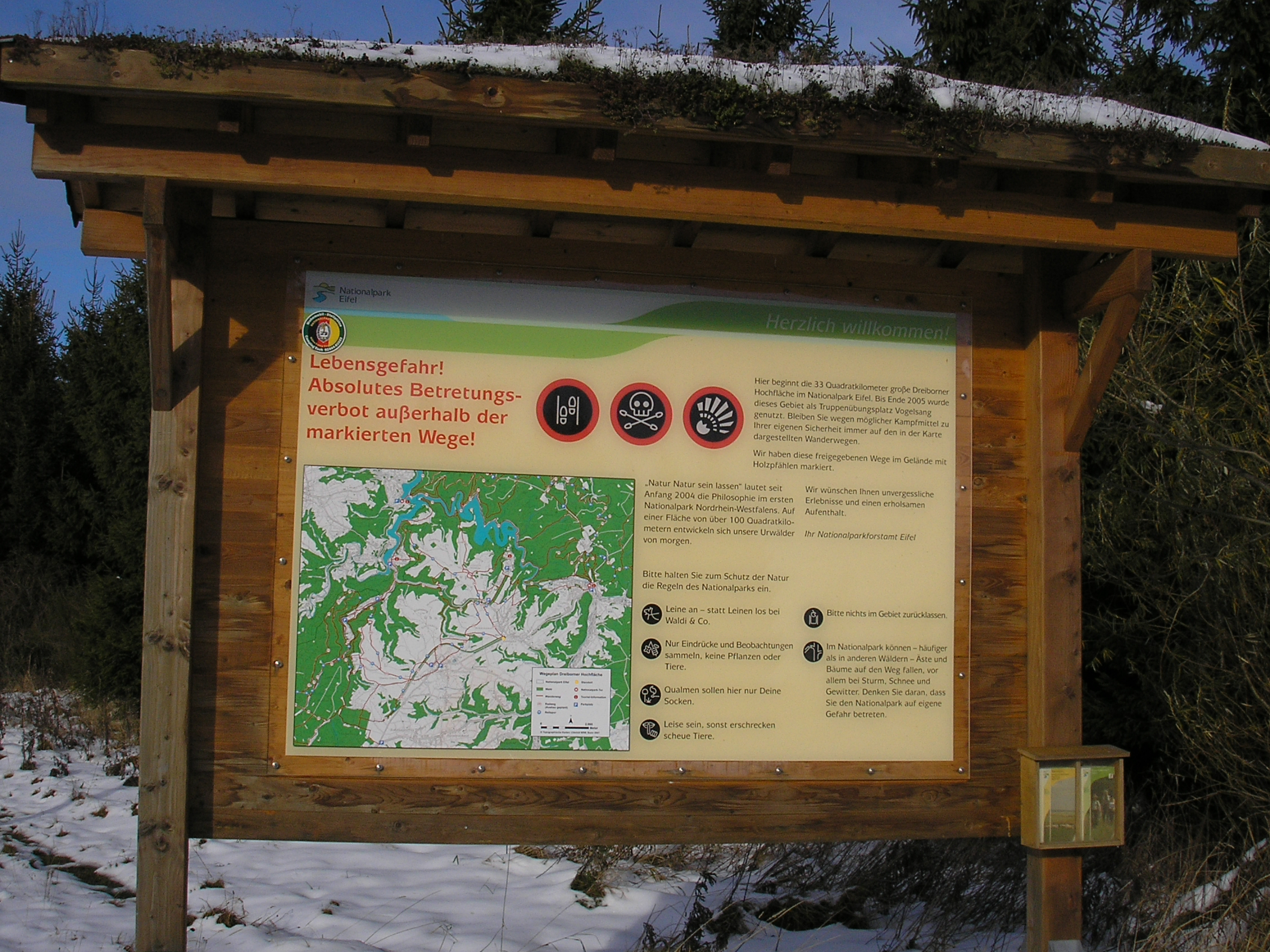
Warning sign near Herhahn

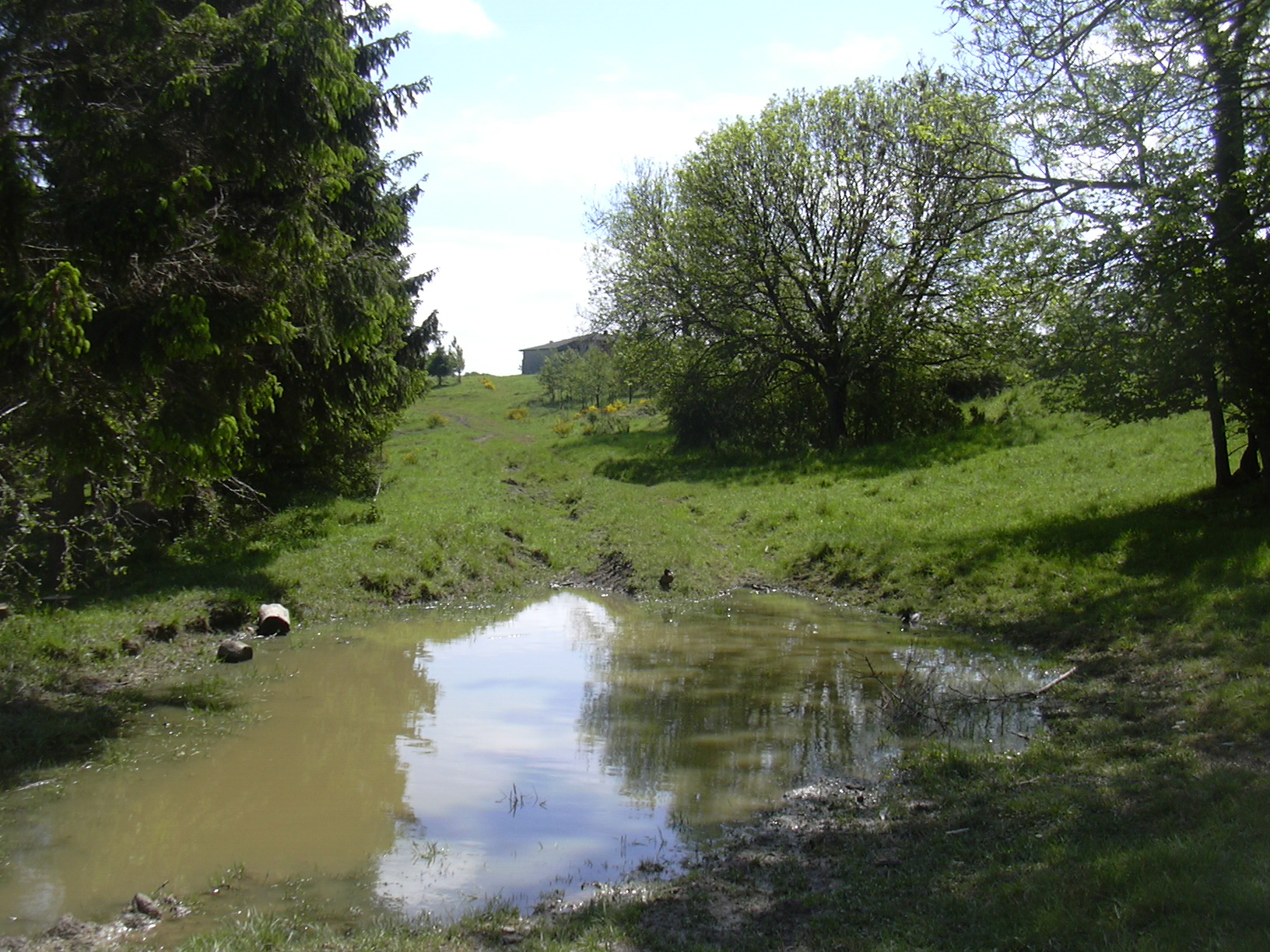
Traces of an old tank track near Wollseifen

In 2007 the hiking network on the Dreiborn Plateau was signed and expanded to about 50 kilometres of path. Walkers must not leave the designated paths to stray into the countryside because there may still be live ammunition lying around from its days as part of the training area. Traces of old tank tracks can still be seen in the terrain in places.

Footpaths run:

- from Erkensruhr and Hirschrott to the hills of the Gierberg and Müsauelsberg, along the source streams of the Erkensruhr and to Dreiborn,
- along the Sauerbach and Helingsbach streams between Einruhr and Dreiborn, Einruhr, Vogelsang and Wollseifen
- between the lakes of Obersee and Urftsee, the village of Wollseifen and Vogelsang.

Many routes can be combined in order to do a circular walk. Some are also open to cyclists.

There are restaurants on the edge of the plateau in Dreiborn and Herhahn.

Ranger guided tours are undertaken by the National Park authority, but many walkers do their own thing without interference.

== Literature ==
- NRW-Stiftung/Eifelverein: Nationalpark Eifel, ThemenTouren, 7 Touren für Wanderer und Radfahrer, 2. aktualisierte Auflage 2004, ISBN 3-7616-1741-0
- Förderverein Nationalpark Eifel (Hrsg.), Heiko Schumacher (Red.): Tier- und Pflanzenwelt im Nationalpark Eifel: ein Begleiter durch Wald, Wasser und Wildnis. Bachem-Verlag, Köln 2006, ISBN 3-7616-2005-5
