= Leven, Fife =

Town in Fife, Scotland

Coordinates: 56.195°N 2.994167°W

Leven: Scottish Gaelic: Inbhir Lìobhann
- Location within Fife
- Population: 10,087
- OS grid reference: NO384007
- Civil parish: Scoonie
- Council area: Fife
- Lieutenancy area: Fife
- Country: Scotland
- Sovereign state: United Kingdom
- Post town: LEVEN
- Postcode district: KY8
- Dialling code: 01333
- Police: Scotland
- Fire: Scottish
- Ambulance: Scottish
- UK Parliament: Glenrothes and North East Fife
- Scottish Parliament: Mid Fife and Glenrothes

Leven (Scottish Gaelic: Inbhir Lìobhann; transl. 'Inverleven', lit. 'mouth of the River Leven') is a seaside town in Fife, set in the east Central Lowlands of Scotland. It lies on the coast of the Firth of Forth at the mouth of the River Leven, 8.1 miles (13.0 km) north-east of the town of Kirkcaldy and 6.4 miles (10.3 km) east of Glenrothes.

According to the 2022 Scottish Census, Leven has a population of 10,087. The town forms part of the Levenmouth conurbation, which has a total population of 37,651.

== History ==
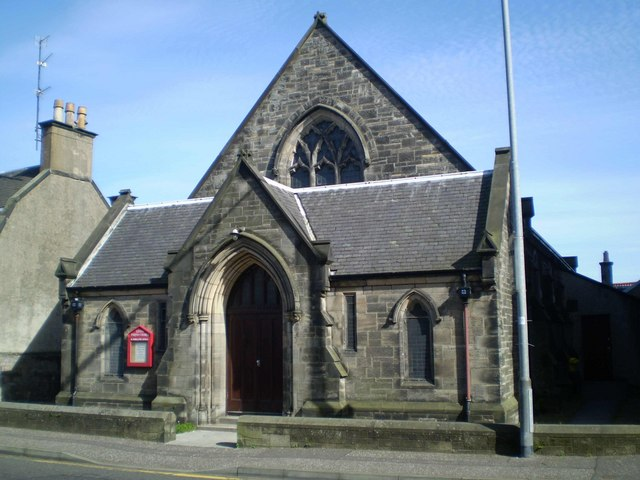
Carlow Hall

The origin of the name "Leven" comes from the Pictish word for "flood". The nearby Loch Leven, being the flood lake, was the name given to both the river and town. A settlement is believed to have formed at the mouth of the River Leven very close to the area around Scoonie Brae with the discovery of the parish church of "scoyne". During the mid-11th century, Bishop Tuadal of St Andrews gifted the church of "scoyne" to the Culdees of Loch Leven. By the end of the 11th century, the village along with the church were acquired by Bishop Robert of St Andrews following the decline of culdeen faith.

The first mention of the current town was made in the middle of the 15th century, according to two separate records referring to the town's name as "levynnis-mouth". This contained information about the urgent need for repair work at the town's monastery and Georgie Durie, a local estate owner, becoming the keeper at the harbour.

In 1854 the Leven Railway opened, linking the town with Thornton Junction on the Edinburgh - Aberdeen main line. This helped it to become a tourist resort popular with visitors from the west of Scotland, and particularly Glasgow. Later in the 19th century the Leven Railway became part of a loop line of the North British Railway linking Thornton Junction and Leuchars Junction via St Andrews. The railway between Leven and St. Andrews closed in 1965. The railway between Leven and Thornton Junction closed to freight in 1966 and passengers in 1969. In 2019 a scheme was approved to re-open the town's railway station. Until then, the nearest station was Markinch railway station. This re-opening occurred on 2 June 2024.

The ecclesiastical and civil parish of Scoonie included the town of Leven.

== Leisure and tourism ==
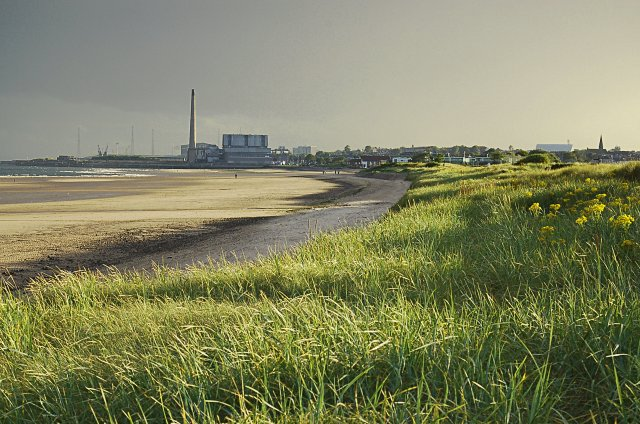
Leven beach

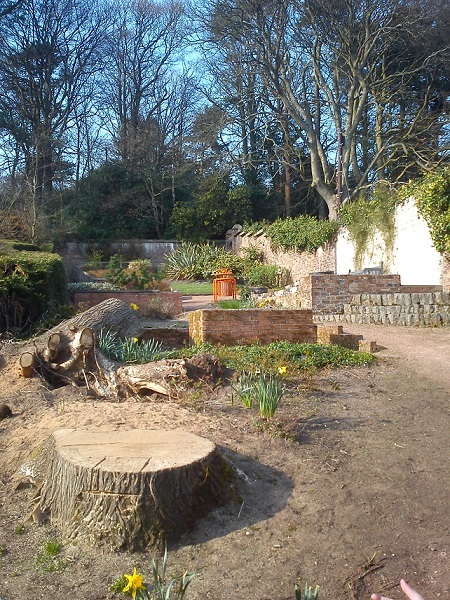
Silverburn Park, 2012

Tourism is a major economic activity in and around Leven. There are several large caravan parks in and around the town, in addition to a number of hotels and guest houses. The neighbouring villages of Lundin Links and Lower Largo have over 50 high quality self-catering properties available for visitors.

The coast and the long sandy beaches are the main visitor draw. Leven has an attractive beach promenade with playparks and other facilities including an indoor Kids Action Zone. The promenade is part of the Fife Coastal Path that stretches for over 150 miles (240 km) from the Firth of Forth to the Firth of Tay. There are also popular family facilities and walks in the large parks at Letham Glen and Silverburn. The former includes a crafts centre and woodland walks, while the latter has attractive gardens and coastal views.

Golf is also a major draw with two courses at Scoonie and Leven Links and another within easy walking distance at Lundin Links. Leven Links has been used as a qualifying course for the Open Championship when it is held at St Andrews, the "home of golf" only 15 miles (24 km) to the north. There are also numerous bowls clubs in and around the town.

A heritage railway has also been established near the Burnmill industrial estate, alongside the now disused Leven-Thornton branch line. With trains running along the yard for half a mile, between April and October with a Santa special in mid-December. The Fife Heritage Railway is the first of its kind in Fife since the closure of Lochty Private Railway in 1992. The railway completed its first steam engine in August 2016.

Levenmouth Leisure Centre, at the start of the promenade, is an all-weather attraction with a large, modern indoor swimming pool and sports facilities. History enthusiasts can find out about the area's past at the Heritage Centre in neighbouring Methil, only a 15-minute walk from Leven town centre.

The town centre is the main shopping centre for a wide area with a number of national chain supermarkets and retailers as well as award-winning independent local retailers. It also has a large number of restaurants and cafes.

== Economic activity ==
Historically, Levenmouth had suffered from poor connections to the rail and main road network of Central Scotland, particularly after the closure of the last railway link in 1969, which came at the same time as the collapse of coal mining. The knock-on effect virtually sealed the fate of Methil as a major port on the East of Scotland. However, on 15 June 2021 the transport minister Graeme Dey announced that rail services would be reintroduced to Leven and Levenmouth with a dual-track railway being constructed. Services were reintroduced on June 2, 2024 after £116m of Scottish Government investment linking Leven to the main line at Thornton.

There are bus links to the nearby town of Kirkcaldy (8 miles (13 km)) from the modern bus station in the centre of the town, and regular express bus services operate to the resort villages of the neighbouring East Neuk and St Andrews, as well as to the capital of Edinburgh.

The main road through Fife, the A92, bypasses this area of Fife, the 4th largest conurbation, whereas Dunfermline, Kirkcaldy and Glenrothes all have good road connections. Leven is linked to Kirkcaldy by the A915 Standing Stane Road and Methil to Kirkcaldy through Dysart and East/West Wemyss. It also has a fast road link to Glenrothes on the A915 that continues on to St Andrews.

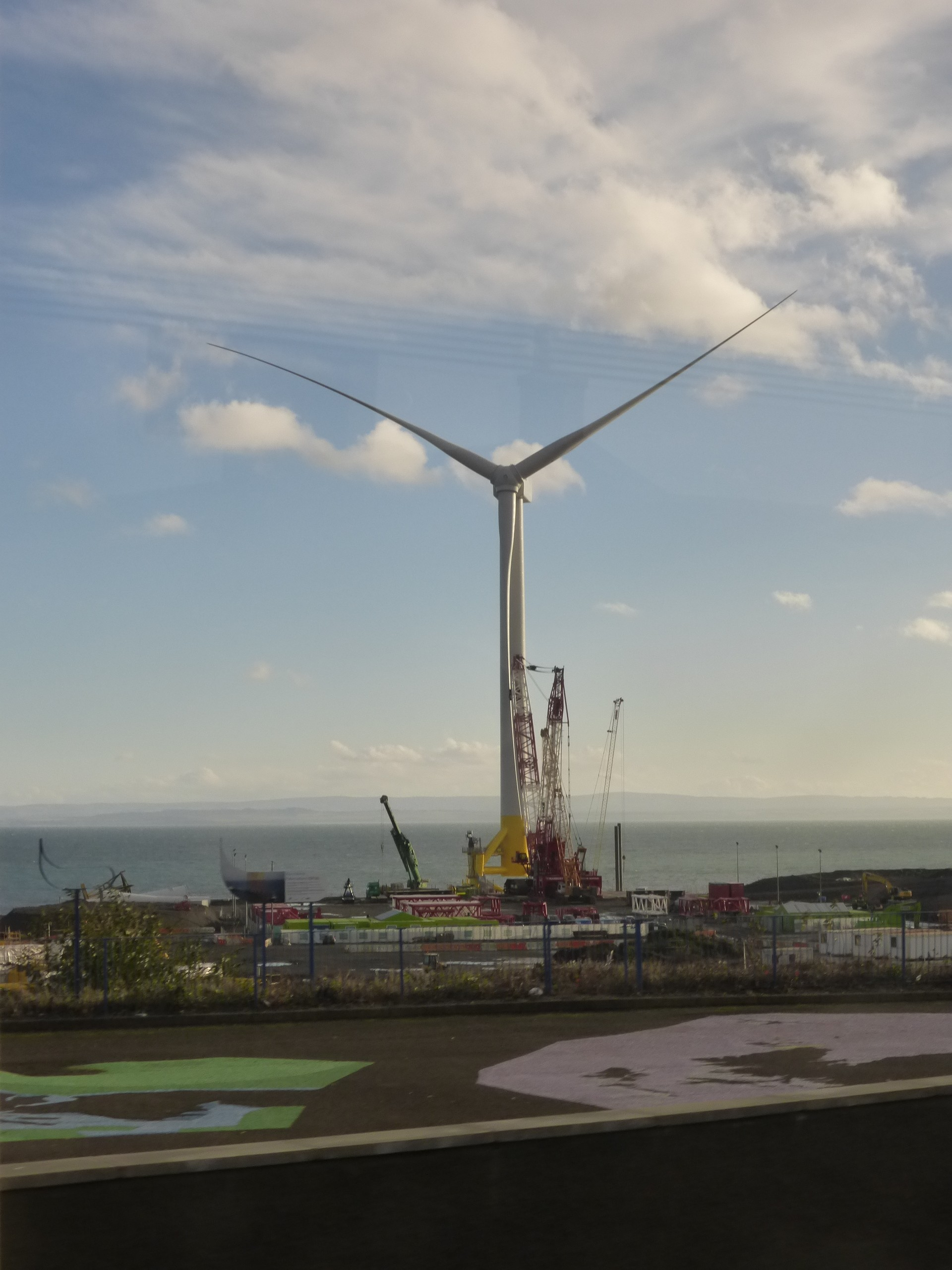
Wind turbine under construction at Methil

Very little remains in the way of major employment since the closure of the coal mining industry. The major employers now are the drinks manufacturer Diageo, which has its main bottling plant in the town, and one of the largest distilleries in the world at Cameron Bridge, near Windygates; and supermarket companies Sainsbury's, Lidl and Aldi, which trade from large stores located throughout the town.

== Education ==
Currently, the town is home to three primary schools. Two of which are non-denominational - Mountfleurie and Parkhill and the other being denominational - St Agatha's.

Parkhill Primary School which serves the centre of the town opened in 1910, initially as an infant school before accepting primary school pupils in 1957. Mountfleurie Primary School, on the other hand, opened in 1957 with an infant department in 1974. The school also has a speech and language class which officially started in 1990. St Agatha's RC Primary School which dates from 1975, following a re-location from Methil, Fife has a catchment area stretching from East Wemyss to Lower Largo.

For Secondary schooling, most children within Leven will go to Levenmouth Academy. Previously, students would attend either Kirkland or Buckhaven high schools but these schools were merged to form Levenmouth Academy.

== Notable residents ==
- Charles Augustus Carlow (1878–1954) mining engineer and colliery owner
- David Gibb (1883–1946) mathematician and astronomer
- Professor Alexander Robert Horne (1881–1953) engineer and author
- Dr Douglas Haig McIntosh (1917–1993) meteorologist
- Jean Redpath (1937–2014) Scottish folk singer, educator and musician.

== Gallery ==
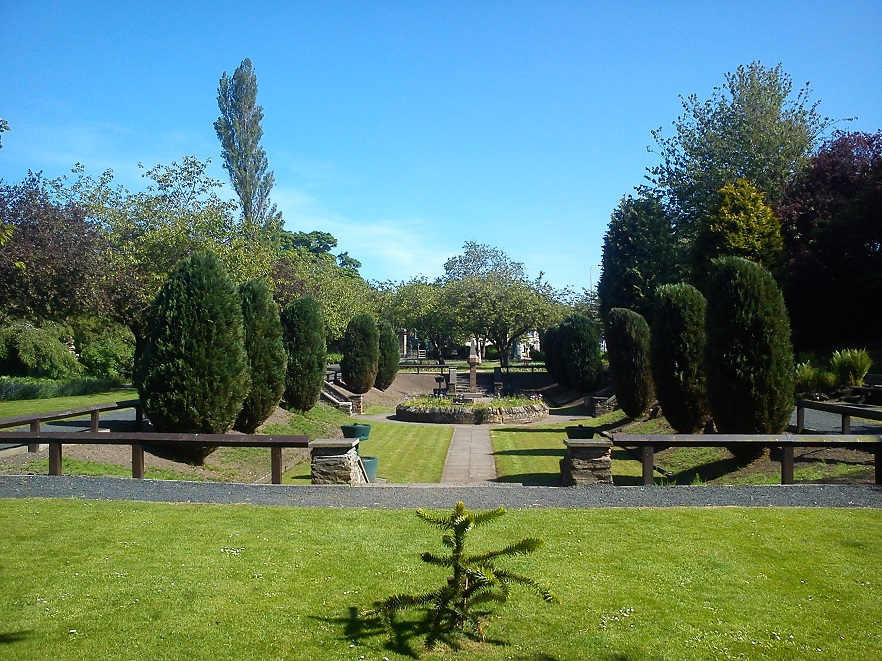
Letham Glen Park

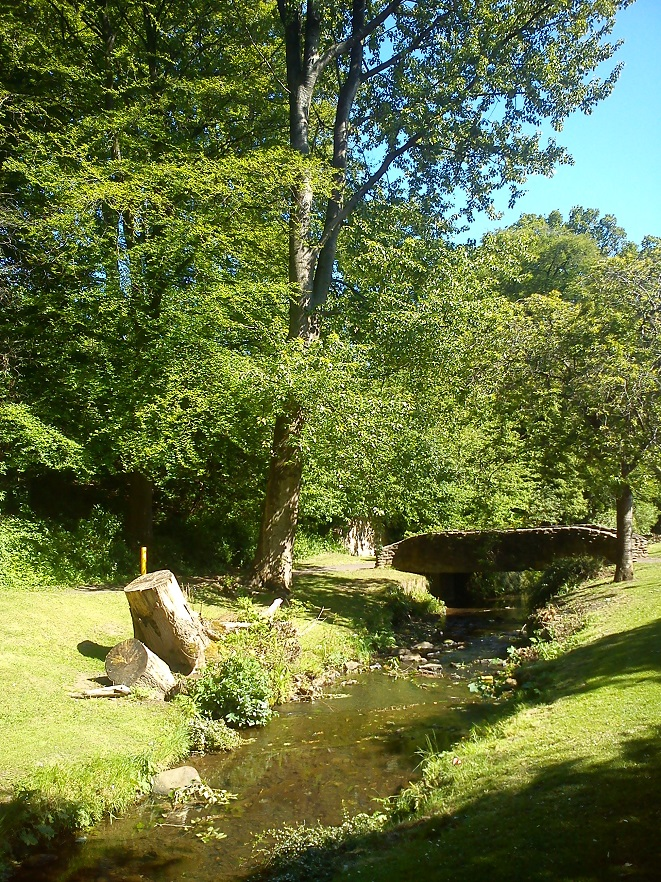
Stream at Letham Glen Park

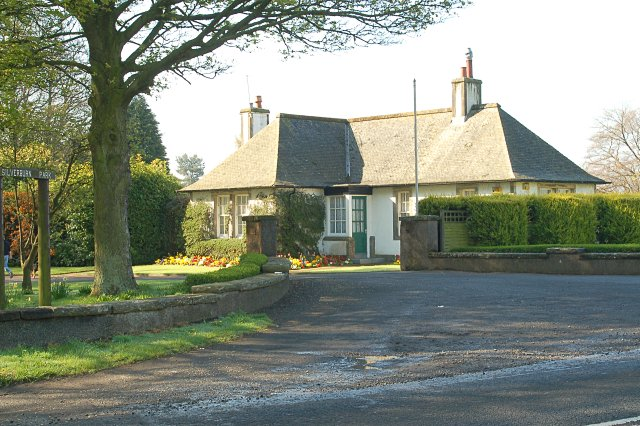
Silverburn Park, Scoonie

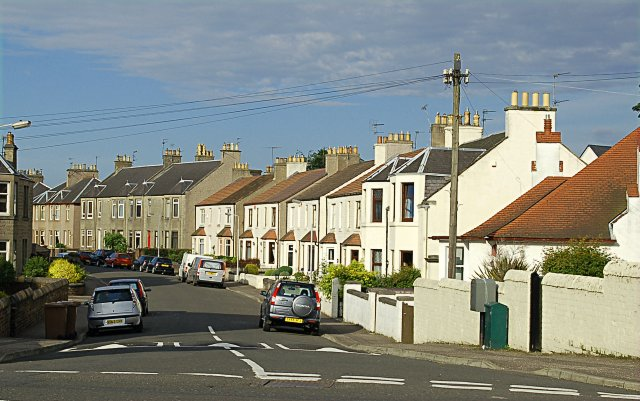
Maitland Street, Leven

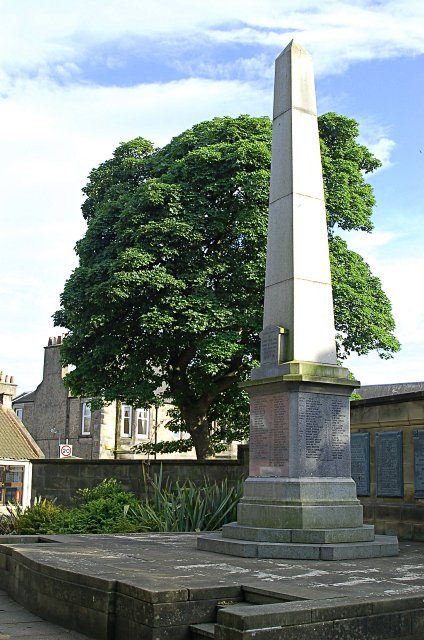
Leven's memorial to the War dead

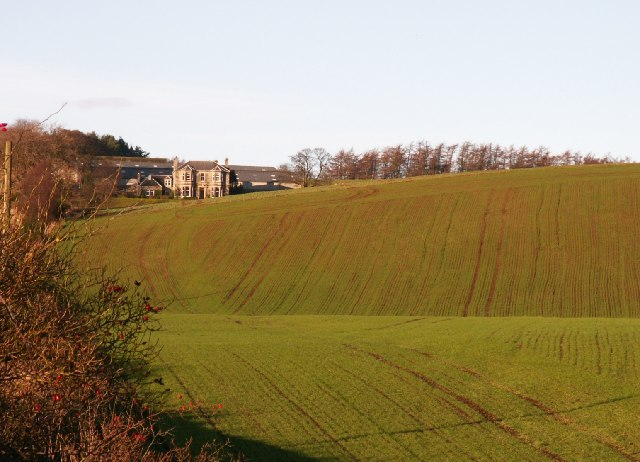
Farmland in Leven

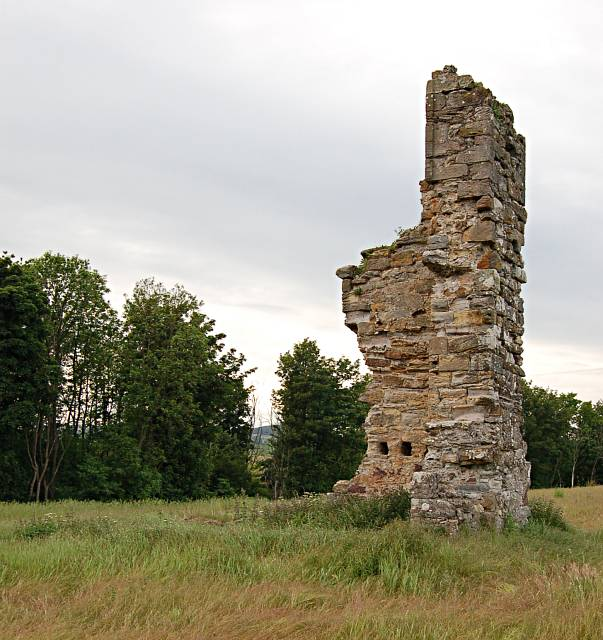
Ruins of Aithernie Castle, Leven

== Twin Towns ==
- (Germany) Leven is twinned with the German town of Holzminden.
- (France) Leven is twinned with the French town of Bruges, Gironde.
