= East Fife Central Railway =

Mineral railway line in Fife, Scotland

The East Fife Central Railway was a mineral railway line in Fife, Scotland, that ran from near Leven to Lochty. It was built to develop extensive coal measures in the area. The line was completed by the North British Railway and it opened in 1898.

The line proved to be not economically viable from the outset. Revenue was raised from an agricultural traffic and some sporadic minor coal working provided traffic for it, although for a brief period between 1911 and 1913, a workmen's passenger service ran to the colliery at Largoward Colliery. The line, which climbed from 65 ft (20 m) to 545 ft (166 m) above sea level, had long sections of steep gradients; from East Fife Central Junction it had a gradient of 1 in 70 almost as far as the 7 mile post, then alternating between moderate gradients and new sections of 1 in 70 as far as the Largobeath Colliery. The line dropped down the same gradients as far as the terminus at Lochty. The line was worked on one-train block system; the speed limit on the entire line was limited to 15 mph. The line closed in 1964.

After line closure, Scottish farmer John Cameron purchased a main line steam engine and operated it on a short length of track at Lochty; this developed into the Lochty Private Railway. Between 1967 and 1992 it operated a small heritage railway and steam museum at Lochty.

== History ==
=== The East Fife Coalfield ===
The first railways in East Fife were built primarily to open up fishing harbours and agricultural districts. The Edinburgh and Northern Railway opened its north–south main line in 1850, having already changed its name to the Edinburgh, Perth and Dundee Railway. It came no closer to East Fife than Dysart and Markinch. The Leven Railway opened a branch from the EP&DR at Thornton to Leven in 1854; but that railway did not immediately approach the harbour at Leven. The East of Fife Railway was built as an extension of the Leven Railway, opening from Leven to Kilconquhar in 1857, and the two companies combined and constructed onwards to Anstruther, so forming the line known as the Fife Coast Railway.

The combined company was called the Leven and East of Fife Railway, and in due course both it and the EP&DR were absorbed by the North British Railway, which became dominant in the area.

For many years coal had been extracted on a small scale from areas near the coast between Dysart and Leven, but transport was always a limiting factor for the mineral. From about 1860 there were definite moves to build railway connections, but the North British Railway had a monopoly of railway transport and did little to develop the colliery connections. However very considerable mineral deposits were discovered under the extensive estate of the Wemyss Family, and coalmaster tenants of the Wemyss Estate, and in due course Randolph Gordon Erskine Wemyss promoted railways independently to serve the pits.

The first of these was the Wemyss and Buckhaven Railway, opened in 1881 from Thornton to Buckhaven, later extended by the Leven Extension Railway to connect Methil and Leven harbours, in 1884. Randolph Wemyss sold the Wemyss and Buckhaven Railway to the NBR, but the development of further pits not served by the existing railways prompted him to construct a network of mineral lines that became known as the Wemyss Estate Railway, or alternatively Wemyss Private Railway.

=== Collieries inland ===
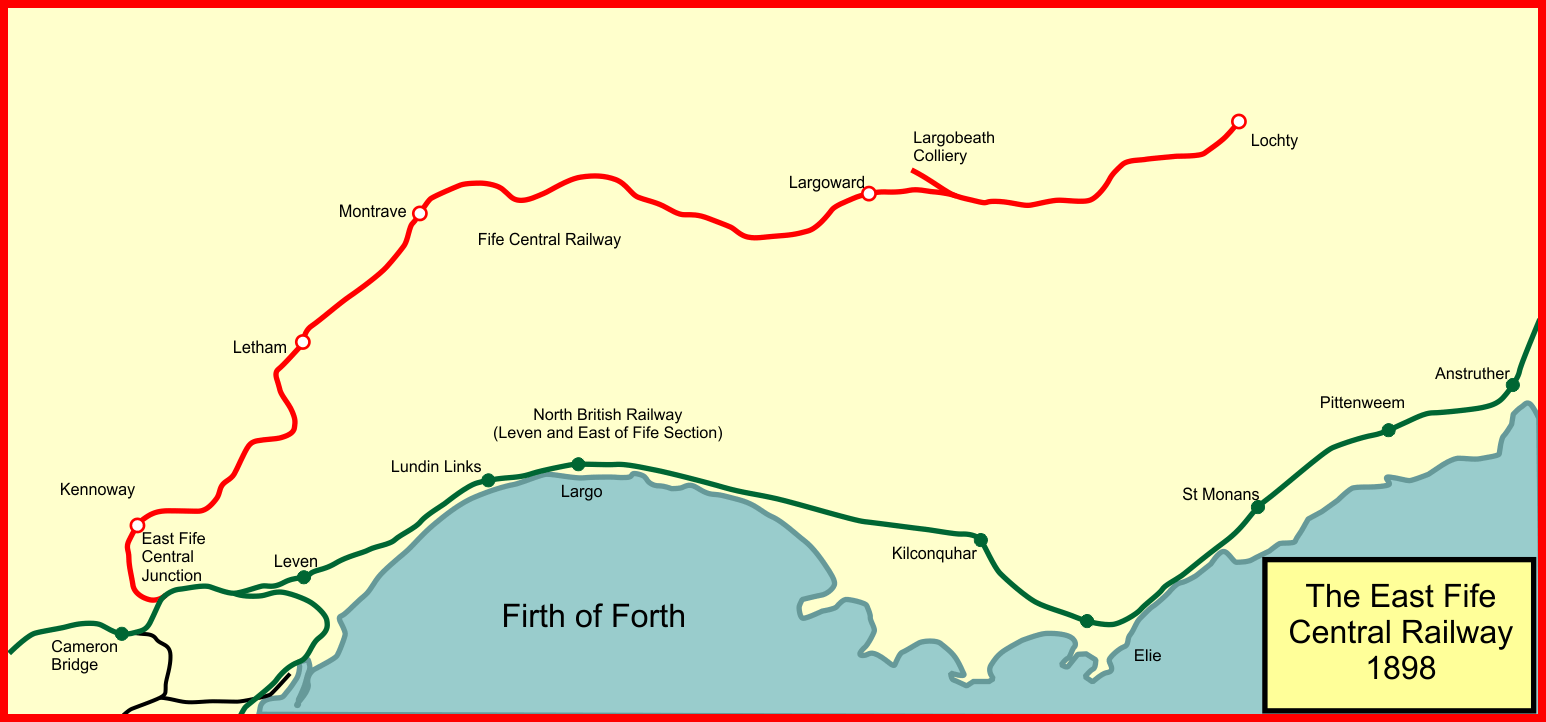
System map of the East Fife Central Railway

The area of land inland from the coast at Methil and Leven, known as the Riggin o Fife, had also been the scene of coal extraction in the past, but its remoteness from the harbours and the poor roads made the work unprofitable. Nonetheless, the wealth of the East Fife coalfield encouraged prospecting, and reports were obtained assuring a good seam of coal at Lochty, about five miles north west of Anstruther: a 40-inch seam of good quality coal at 10 fathoms. A railway was essential to the exploitation of the mineral, and a meeting was held in Edinburgh on 19 October 1892 to propose it. As well as the coal, the agriculture of the district would benefit from a railway, and those present were positive towards paying for further surveys. The railway would connect with the Leven and East of Fife line (now in NBR ownership) forming a triangle of lines there, then running north east and forking to join the NBR main line north of Cupar, and through Lochty to join the Anstruther to St Andrews line near Stravithie. Further rich coal seams aggregating to 60 feet were said to be under the line of route. The parliamentary bill for the line, to be known as the East Fife Central Railway, was deposited in January 1893; it proposed share capital of £250,000.

=== The parliamentary process ===
Local people were broadly in favour of the proposed railway, but objections in Parliament came from two existing railways. The North British Railway objected on the ground, they claimed, that the district was already well served by them, and that the line would abstract from their business. The rival Caledonian Railway objected on the basis that the NBR was already a monopoly carrier in the district, and that they, the Caledonian, ought to have running powers on the line.

George Bradley Wieland was the chairman of the East Fife Central; he was a director of the North British Railway, and he had been secretary of that company, but had resigned that office due to ill health. Wieland acquired the Letham Estate, close to the proposed line, on 14 March 1892, believing there to be extensive workable coal reserves there, and he naturally would welcome a railway connection. As a director of the NBR he was able to intercede, and the NBR objection was lifted: the NBR would work the line for 50% of gross receipts, but a formula guaranteed 4.5% of paid up East Fife Central shares. (Note: This arrangement was never activated because the company never managed to raise the capital to build the line itself.) The Caledonian Railway was granted running powers over the line, and the East Fife Central itself acquired running powers into St Andrews over the Anstruther and St Andrews Railway.

East Fife Central Railway Act 1893
- Act of Parliament
- Parliament of the United Kingdom
- Long title: An Act for incorporating the East Fife Central Railway Company and authorising the Construction of Railways in the county of Fife and for other purposes.
- Citation: 56 & 57 Vict. c. cxcvi

Dates
- Royal assent: 24 August 1893

Text of statute as originally enacted

The East Fife Central Railway Act 1893 (56 & 57 Vict. c. cxcvi) was given royal assent on 24 August 1893. G. B. Wieland was confirmed as chairman of the company.

=== Realistic plans ===
During the progress of the bill in Parliament, the directors considered how they would raise the necessary money. The earlier certainty about mineral wealth had abated, and the thin population of the agricultural district now looked less lucrative. Raising the money in the ordinary way now appeared to be impossible, and at length Wieland prevailed on the North British to fund the construction; they agreed subject to guarantees from the East Fife Central board members, giving the NBR a 3% return on the capital expenditure of £104,820. The through routes to Cupar and St Andrews were now abandoned, as was the triangular junction at Leven, and the line was cut back to Lochty, 14 miles in extent. Even that destination began to look doubtful, for it was reported in May 1895 that the trial borings there for coal had been disappointing. The junction near Cameron Bridge would be aligned to give direct running from Lochty to Leven and Methil harbours.

At the first formal meeting of the newly authorised company on 14 February 1894, four directors executed formal guarantees, and others apparently did so later. The modification of the route required a new act of Parliament; this was prepared by the NBR, also authorising passenger operation, and transfer of the line to themselves one year after the passage of the bill. That act of Parliament, the North British Railway Act 1895 (58 & 59 Vict. c. cli), received royal assent on 6 July 1895.

=== Construction and opening ===
There was further prevarication over the guarantees, but eventually the North British Railway appears to have accepted the situation, and construction started in August 1895. The NBR absorbed the East Fife Central on 6 July 1896. The construction progressed well enough, and on 29 July 1898 the line was substantially complete; seven gentlemen from Kennoway were permitted to take a private trip on the line using the contractor's engine and wagons. The contractor handed over the completed line to the North British Railway on 4 August 1898, and the line opened for goods and mineral traffic on Sunday 21 August 1898. (Note: Thomas & Turnock, and Awdry, give 18 August 1898, but Hajducki provides considerable supplementary detail for 21 August and seems to be authoritative.) The goods stations on the line were Kennoway, Montrave, Largoward and Lochty. It was the longest goods-only line in the country.

Initial business was exceedingly disappointing, and the intended mineral traffic was close to negligible; the trial borings at Lochty had disclosed no workable coal. By June 1900 consideration was being given to reducing the daily train to three days a week. The capital expenditure on the line had been £132,463 and this now looked like wasted money.

For the year to 31 August 1899 receipts amounted to £1,124, but the 3% interest payable to the NBR was £3,973. The guarantors of the shortfall now began to consider their position. It appears that the NBR eventually released them from the full liability that they had undertaken.

=== Later operation ===
Although some colliery work was undertaken along the line, the collieries were mostly of short duration and limited output.

In the summer of 1910 Territorial Army camps were established near Largoward, and special arrangements were made to convey the 6th Argyll and Sutherland Highlanders to Largoward by rail, accompanied by their horse and equipment, and water in tanks. The traffic may have lasted for four weeks.

When the Largobeath Colliery started exploratory work in 1911, there was insufficient accommodation locally for the miners, and a workmen's passenger service was set up from Cameron Bridge, with stations at Kennoway, Montrave, Largoward and Largobeath Colliery. There was one train each way daily; it reversed at East Fife Central Junction. However, by November 1913 the trains were discontinued; serious water inundation problems were experienced in the Largobeath workings, and in fact the colliery closed permanently soon afterwards. (Note: From Hajducki; Ross says the passenger trains ran in 1913–1914, citing periodicals of the North British Railway Study Group. Quick says "First shown in working timetable February 1913 (probably soon after start of service) and March 1914". Thomas & Turnock give closure to passengers as 7 July 1930, but this must be an error.)

There was some reduction in the (already limited) train service during World War I. In 1923 the main line railways of Great Britain were "grouped" following the Railways Act 1921, and the North British Railway was a constituent of the new London and North Eastern Railway (LNER). After the war, a large number of road motor lorries became available, and a road goods service began to develop, to the detriment of the meagre income of the line. The LNER reduced the train service to three trains a week. Goods traffic continued to decline.

British Railways took over the railways on nationalisation in 1948.

With an almost non-existent goods business, the line could hardly carry on and on 8 August 1964 the last service train ran on the line.

== Heritage railway and steam museum ==
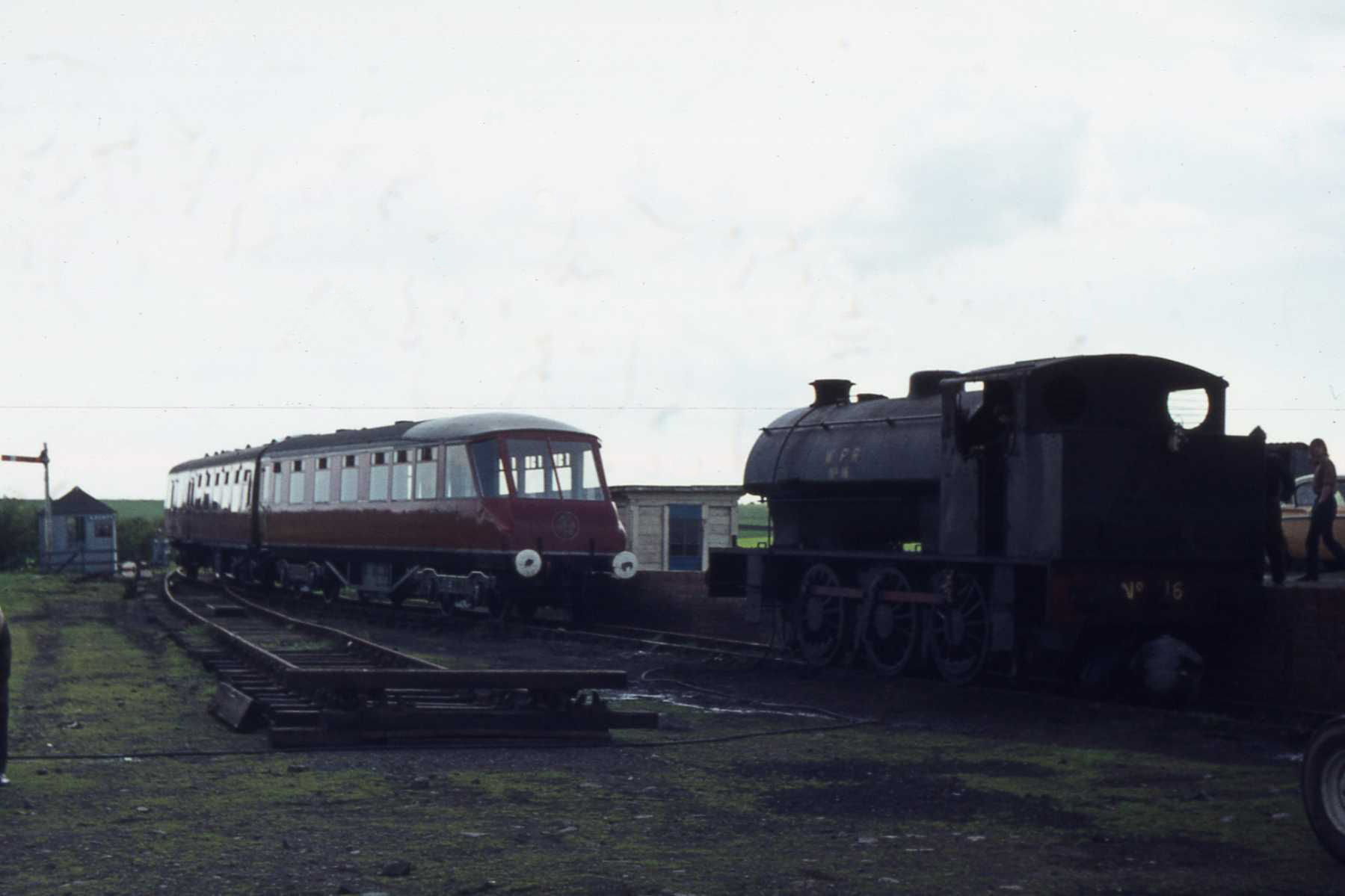
The observation coach at the Lochty Private Railway

In August 1966, John B Cameron purchased Lochty Farm, which included part of the course of the railway. He also acquired the LNER Class A4 locomotive 60009, Union of South Africa. He had the locomotive transported by road to Lochty in April 1967, and bought some track from the National Coal Board, enabling him to lay about three-quarters of a mile of line near Lochty. Footplate rides were given on the engine in the summer of 1967, and the following year a coach had been acquired, enabling trips in a short train, operating as the Lochty Private Railway. In 1970 the line was extended slightly and a further coach acquired for runs on the line.

From 1973 the locomotive was returned to the main line network and Lochty was converted to a steam museum; some smaller locomotives were acquired, starting with an 0-6-0 from the Wemyss Estate Railway, no 16. Regular Sunday trips on the line were made in the summer, and the location was popular with holidaymakers and others; the operation was entirely staffed by volunteers.

At the end of the 1992 season it was decided that rising costs of operation made continuing impossible, and the museum at Lochty closed.

That same year, The Kingdom of Fife Railway Preservation Society was formed to take over the remaining collection at the railway and in 1994, the last of the collection was moved from Lochty by the society. Today, the rolling stock is now based at Kirkland yard in Leven, Fife.

== See also ==
- Fife Heritage Railway
