= Methil railway station =

Disused railway station in Methil, Fife

Coordinates: 56°10′59″N 3°00′49″W

Methil

General information
- Location: Methil, Fife; Scotland
- Platforms: 1

Other information
- Status: Disused

History
- Original company: Leven Extension Railway
- Pre-grouping: North British Railway
- Post-grouping: London and North Eastern Railway

Key dates
- 5 May 1887: Opened
- 10 January 1955: Closed
Location

Methil railway station is a former station that served the village of Methil, Fife, Scotland, from 1887 to 1955 on the Leven Extension Railway.

== History ==
The station opened on 5 May 1887, courtesy of the Leven Extension Railway. To the south lay the goods yard, featuring a large goods shed, and further south, Methil Yard, which connected to Methil Docks. Initially, it boasted nine sidings and a branch line serving Denbeath Colliery. In 1900, a second dock siding debuted, accompanied by eight additional pairs of sidings. A third dock siding followed in 1912, bringing the total to around seventeen sidings, capable of accommodating 516 wagons. The station closed to passengers on 10 January 1955 but remained operational as a goods station, occasionally hosting football excursions in 1958. Methil Yard ceased general goods operations in 1980 but continued to handle coal until 1985.

Preceding station	Disused railways	Following station
Buckhaven; Line and station closed	Leven Extension Railway	Terminus
