= Buckhaven railway station =

Disused railway station in Buckhaven, Fife

Buckhaven
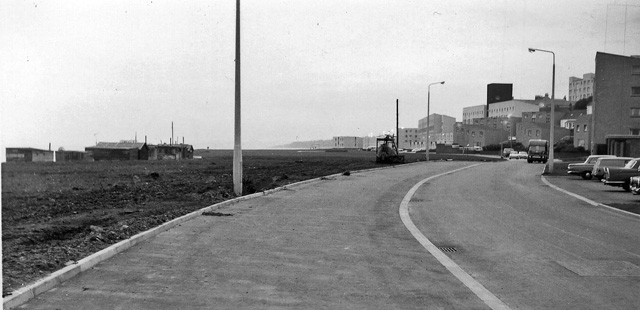
- The site of the station in 1974

General information
- Location: Buckhaven, Fife; Scotland
- Coordinates: 56.1718°N 3.038°W
- Grid reference: NT356981
- Platforms: 1

Other information
- Status: Disused

History
- Original company: Wemyss and Buckhaven Railway
- Pre-grouping: North British Railway
- Post-grouping: London and North Eastern Railway; British Railways (Scottish Region)

Key dates
- 8 August 1881: Opened
- 10 January 1955: Closed to passengers
- 28 December 1964: Closed to goods
Location

Buckhaven railway station served the town of Buckhaven, Fife, Scotland, from 1881 to 1964 on the Wemyss and Buckhaven Railway.

== History ==
The station was opened on 8 August 1881 by the Wemyss and Buckhaven Railway. To the west was the goods yard and to the north was its sidings. To the north of this was Buckhaven Saw Mills. The station closed to passengers on 10 January 1955 and closed to goods on 28 December 1964.

Preceding station	Disused railways	Following station
Wemyss Castle; Line and station closed	Wemyss and Buckhaven Railway	Terminus
Terminus	Leven Extension Railway	Methil; Line and station closed
