= West Wemyss railway station =

Disused railway station in West Wemyss, Fife

Coordinates: 56.1584°N 3.1074°W

West Wemyss

General information
- Location: West Wemyss, Fife; Scotland
- Platforms: 1 (initially); 2 (later added)

Other information
- Status: Disused

History
- Original company: Wemyss and Buckhaven Railway
- Pre-grouping: North British Railway
- Post-grouping: London and North Eastern Railway

Key dates
- 8 August 1881: Opened as East Wemyss
- 1 January 1917: Closed temporarily
- 2 June 1919: Reopened
- 8 November 1949: Closed permanently
Location

West Wemyss railway station served the village of West Wemyss, Fife, Scotland, from 1881 to 1949 on the Wemyss and Buckhaven Railway.

== History ==
The station was opened on 8 August 1881 by the Wemyss and Buckhaven Railway. To the opposite of the platform was a goods bank siding. A second platform was later added. The station closed temporarily on 1 January but reopened on 2 June 1919. At the east end was the signal box. It was replaced in 1921, being sited on the north side of the line, and closed in 1927. The station closed on 8 November 1949.

Preceding station	Disused railways	Following station
Thornton Junction; Line and station closed	Wemyss and Buckhaven Railway	Wemyss Castle; Line and station closed
