= Wemyss Castle railway station =

Disused railway station in East Wemyss, Fife

Wemyss Castle
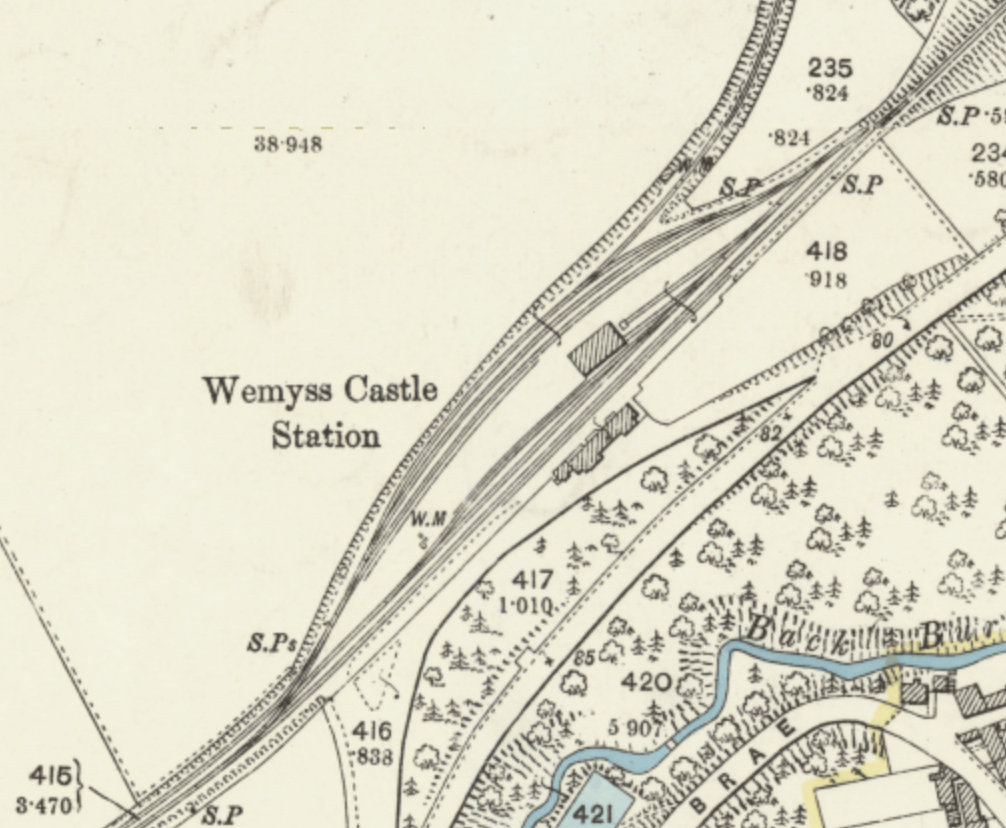
- Wemyss Castle Station depicted on an 1895 Ordnance Survey map

General information
- Location: East Wemyss, Fife; Scotland
- Coordinates: 56.1602°N 3.0678°W
- Grid reference: NT337969
- Platforms: 1

Other information
- Status: Disused

History
- Original company: Wemyss and Buckhaven Railway
- Pre-grouping: North British Railway
- Post-grouping: London and North Eastern Railway

Key dates
- 8 August 1881: Opened as East Wemyss
- 15 September 1881: Name changed to Wemyss Castle
- 10 January 1955: Closed
Location

Wemyss Castle railway station served the village of East Wemyss, Fife, Scotland, from 1881 to 1955 on the Wemyss and Buckhaven Railway.

== History ==
The station was opened as East Wemyss on 8 August 1881 by the Wemyss and Buckhaven Railway. To the north was the goods yard, to the east of the platform was the station building and on the platform was the signal box. The station's name was changed to Wemyss Castle on 15 September 1881. A line opened to the west which served Michael Colliery. The station closed on 10 January 1955.

Preceding station	Disused railways	Following station
West Wemyss; Line and station closed	Wemyss and Buckhaven Railway	Buckhaven; Line and station closed
