= Methil =

Town in Fife, Scotland

Coordinates: 56.1844°N 3.0223°W

Methil: Scottish Gaelic: Meadhchill
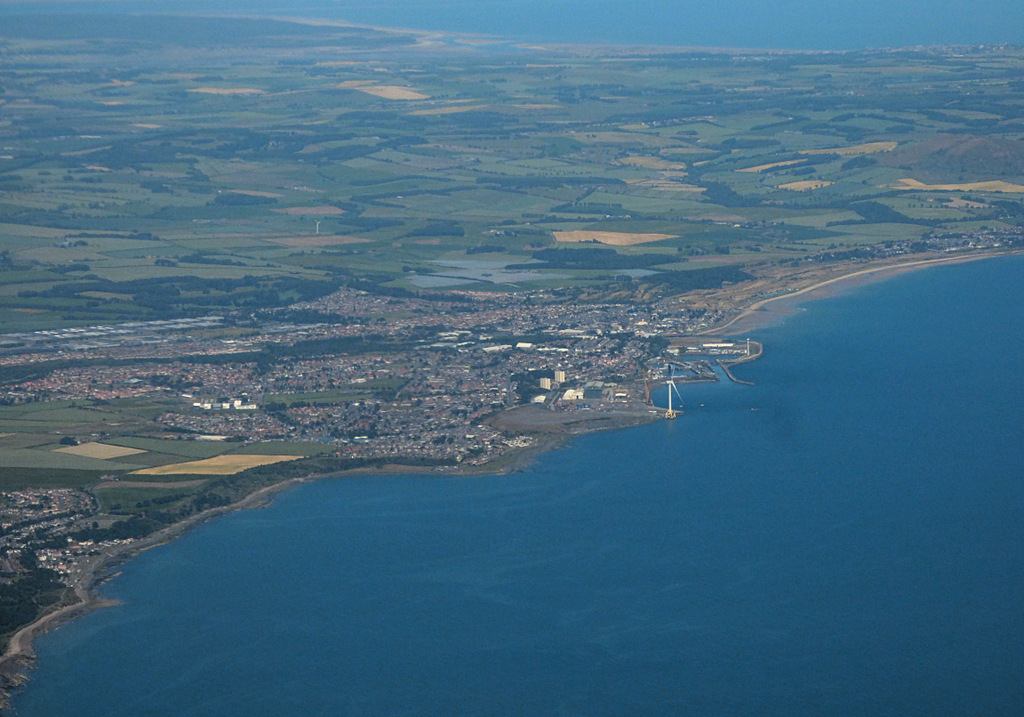
- East Wemyss, Buckhaven, Methil and Leven from the air

- Location within Fife
- Area: 4.79 km^{2} (1.85 sq mi)
- Population: 10,890 (2020)
  - Density: 2,273/km^{2} (5,890/sq mi)
- OS grid reference: NT365995
  - Edinburgh: 17 mi (27 km)
  - London: 344 mi (554 km)
- Council area: Fife
- Country: Scotland
- Sovereign state: United Kingdom
- Post town: Leven
- Postcode district: KY8
- Dialling code: 01333
- Police: Scotland
- Fire: Scottish
- Ambulance: Scottish
- UK Parliament: Glenrothes and Mid Fife
- Scottish Parliament: Kirkcaldy

Methil (Scottish Gaelic: Meadhchill) is a coastal town in Fife, Scotland.

Methil has ancient origins: two Bronze Age cemeteries have been discovered which date the settlement as over 8,000 years old. The town was first recorded as "Methkil" in 1207, and belonged to the Bishop of St Andrews. Methil was part of its own barony from 1614 and also part of the former burgh of Buckhaven and Methil, which existed between 1891 and 1975. Previously an industrial maritime powerhouse of the region and once Scotland's greatest coal port, it is now redirecting itself towards a green energy future.

Methil lies on the north shore of the Firth of Forth, between Largo Bay to the east and Wemyss Bay to the west. It is situated within a continuous urban area described as Levenmouth; the River Leven delineates Methil from adjacent towns. The Fife Coastal Path, one of Scotland's Great Trails, runs through Methil. The town has a population of 10,890 (2022).

== Toponymy ==
The name, Methil, is from Scottish Gaelic, and appears to derive from meadh(on) meaning 'middle' and cill meaning 'church'.

Initially centred on the medieval church on the River Leven, the centre moved to a burgh and port in the seventeenth century known also as "Methilltoune" (1670) and "Methilburgh" (1795), with the alternative name of "Innerleven". William Roy's Map of Scotland refers to the town as "Methill Pans", a reference to the salt industry, with Inverleven indicated as a separate settlement. The town is sometimes referred to locally as The Methil.

== Overview ==
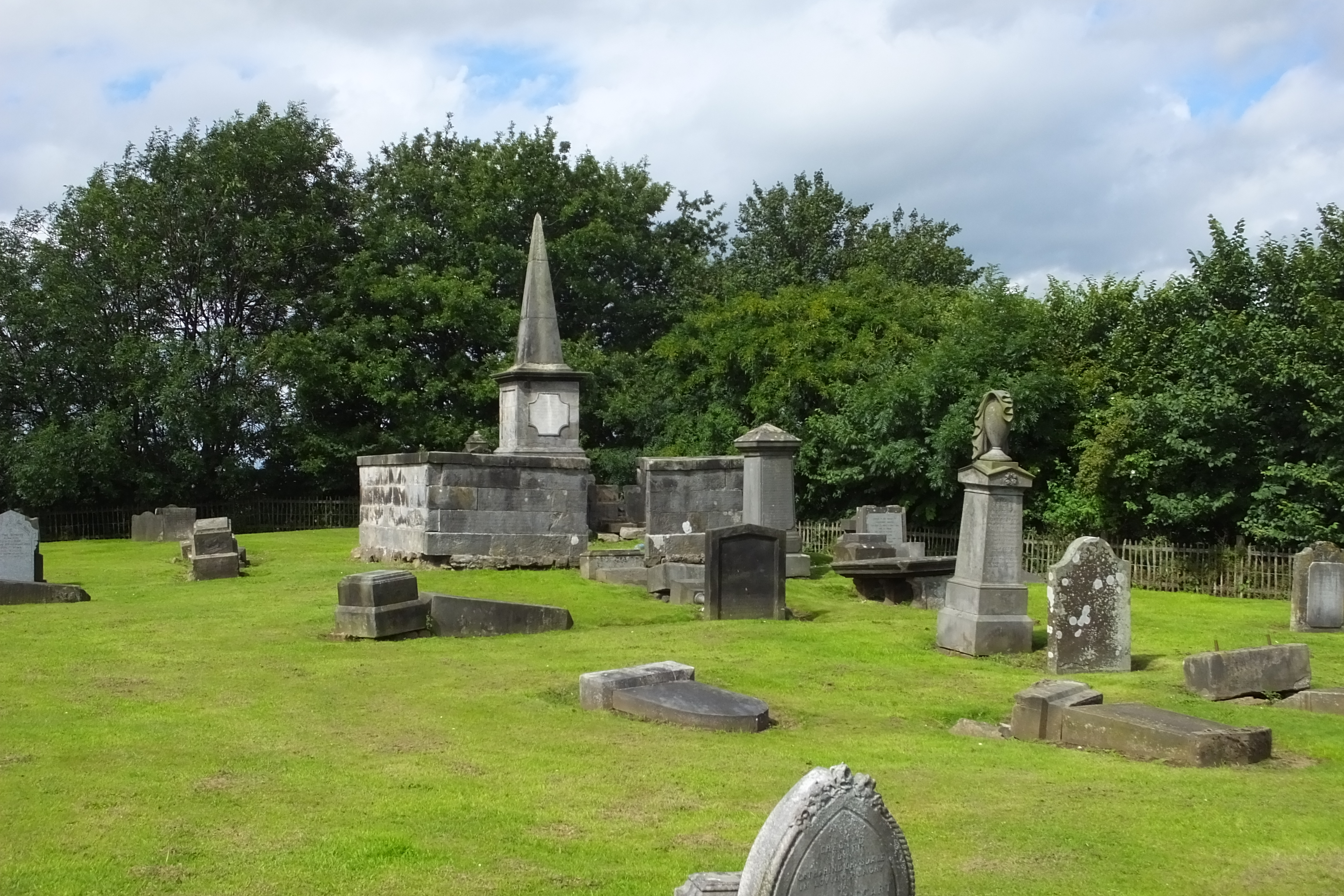
Site of the pre-Reformation Methil Parish Church, now part of Methilmill Cemetery.

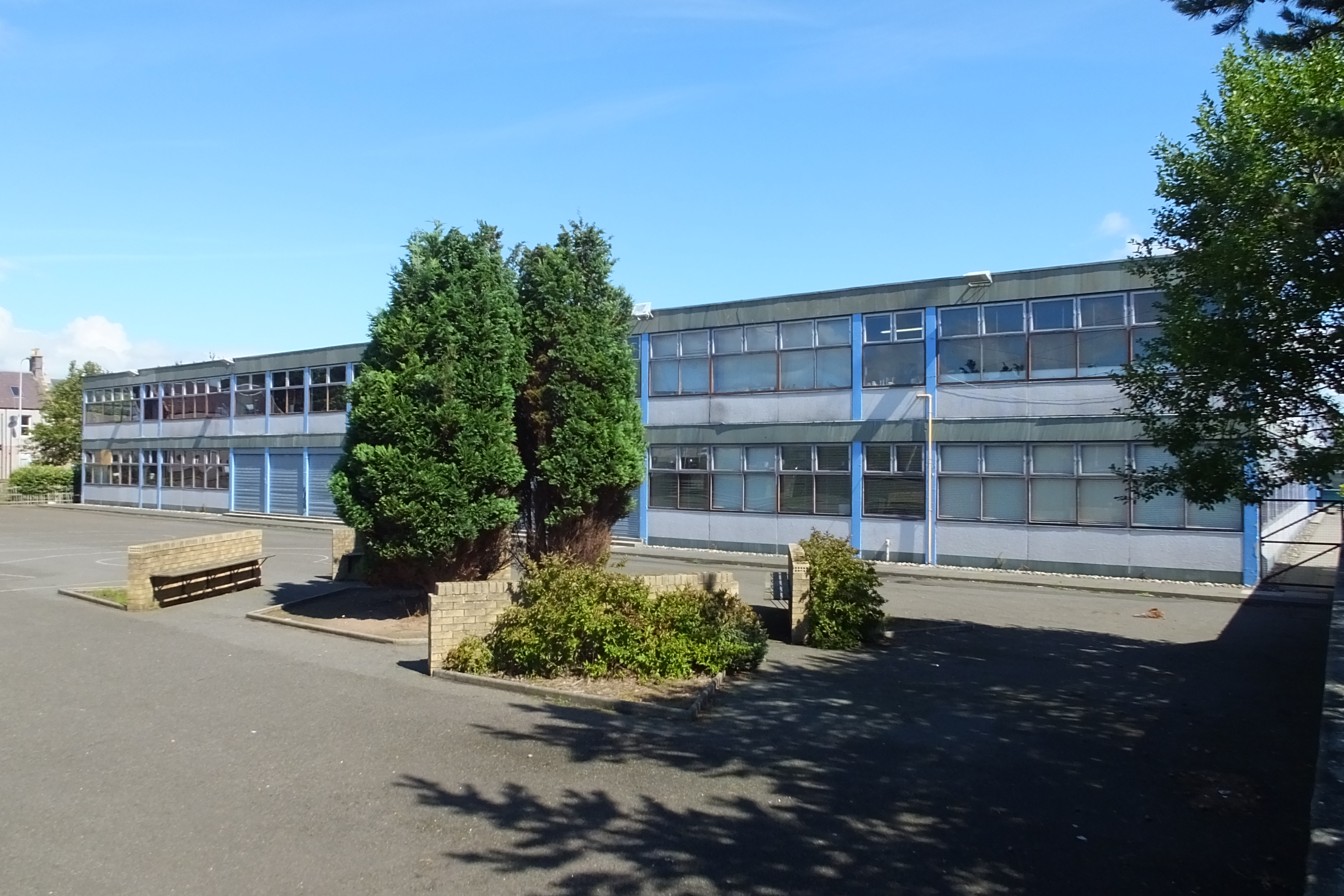
Kirkland High School, taken shortly before demolition in 2016.

Prior to the Reformation when Methil was absorbed into the Parish of Wemyss, it was an independent parish centred around a church situated inland of what is now Methilmill Cemetery. In the 17th century, it developed as a coastal village, first with a tidal harbour, thereafter expanding considerably at the start of the 20th century due to a boom in coal mining.

From 1920 the development of (mainly) council housing caused the town to expand inland to meet up with the formerly separate village of Methilhill and reach the boundaries of Methilmill Cemetery and the site of the ancient parish church.

Historically, the main industry in the area was coal mining, with most of the coal exported through Methil Docks, which exported over 3,000,000 tons per year between the WW1 and WW2. A related development was Methil Power Station (1960), which was sited at the mouth of the River Leven. It was eventually demolished in 2011. This power station used colliery slurry, which would otherwise have gone to waste.

Nearby is the new Bayview Stadium, home to East Fife Football Club, previously located more centrally in the town at the corner of Wellesley and Kirkland Roads.

== Facilities ==
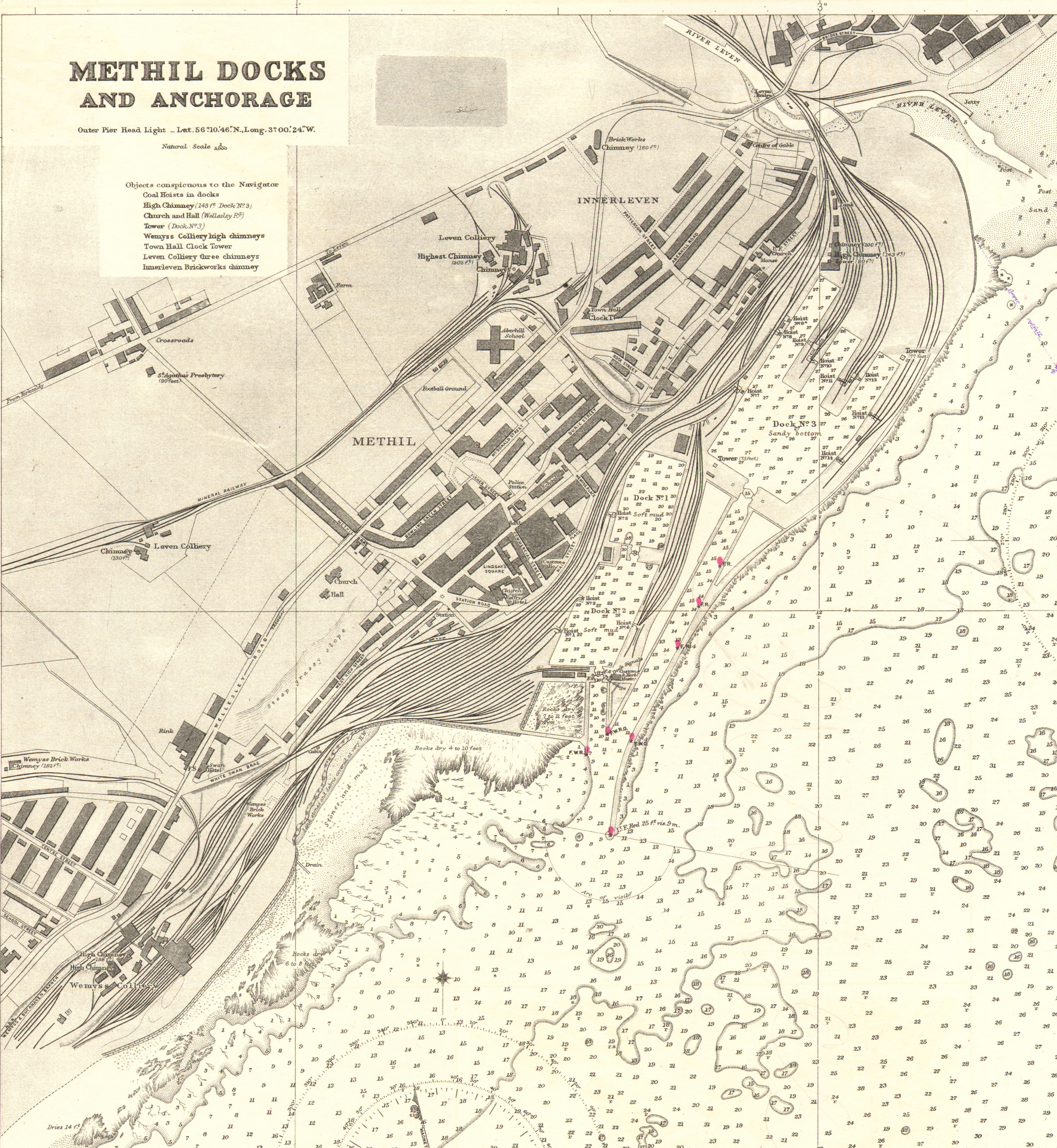
Methil Docks from an Admiralty Chart Published in 1918

Methil Docks was particularly significant during World War II for the movement of coal and other resources. The docks had a hydro electric power station serving the distinctive coal hoists, all of which were once local landmarks. The town was traversed by several railways linking the local collieries to the docks, one of which crossed the High Street on an overbridge. After the post-war nationalisation of the railways, the coal mines and the docks continued to be linked by the Wemyss Private Railway as well as by British Railways (which had replaced the LNER and the North British Railway).

Work is ongoing to reopen the railway line from Thornton Junction, which would arguably help both trade and improve public transport, including tourism for the whole area. It is scheduled to be open for traffic in spring 2024. The "Hydrogen Office" based in the docks aims to demonstrate the benefits of improved energy efficiency and renewable and hydrogen energy systems.

Kirkland High School and Community College was a secondary education and combined education college. It was amalgamated with Buckhaven High School in August 2016 to form Levenmouth Academy, both of the older schools being demolished immediately thereafter. Primary schools in the area include Denbeath Primary, Aberhill Primary ('listed' as of architectural/historical interest and long outliving the 1950s and 1960s secondary school buildings) and Methilhill Primary.

Local politics is controlled by Fife Council although there is interest being shown by some people in redeveloping more locally centred councils. Methilhill had a Community Council for a period of time, although it is not currently active.

There is a committee of Fife councillors elected to represent the area described by Fife Council as "Levenmouth" (which includes Methil and other nearby towns – although the description "Levenmouth" does not have a historical or otherwise substantive reason or purpose as a nomenclature, it does provide for political expediency and accords favourably with current local civil service ease of operation).
