= Fife Heritage Railway =

Heritage railway line in Scotland

Coordinates: 56.195088°N 3.016513°W

Kingdom of Fife Railway Preservation Society
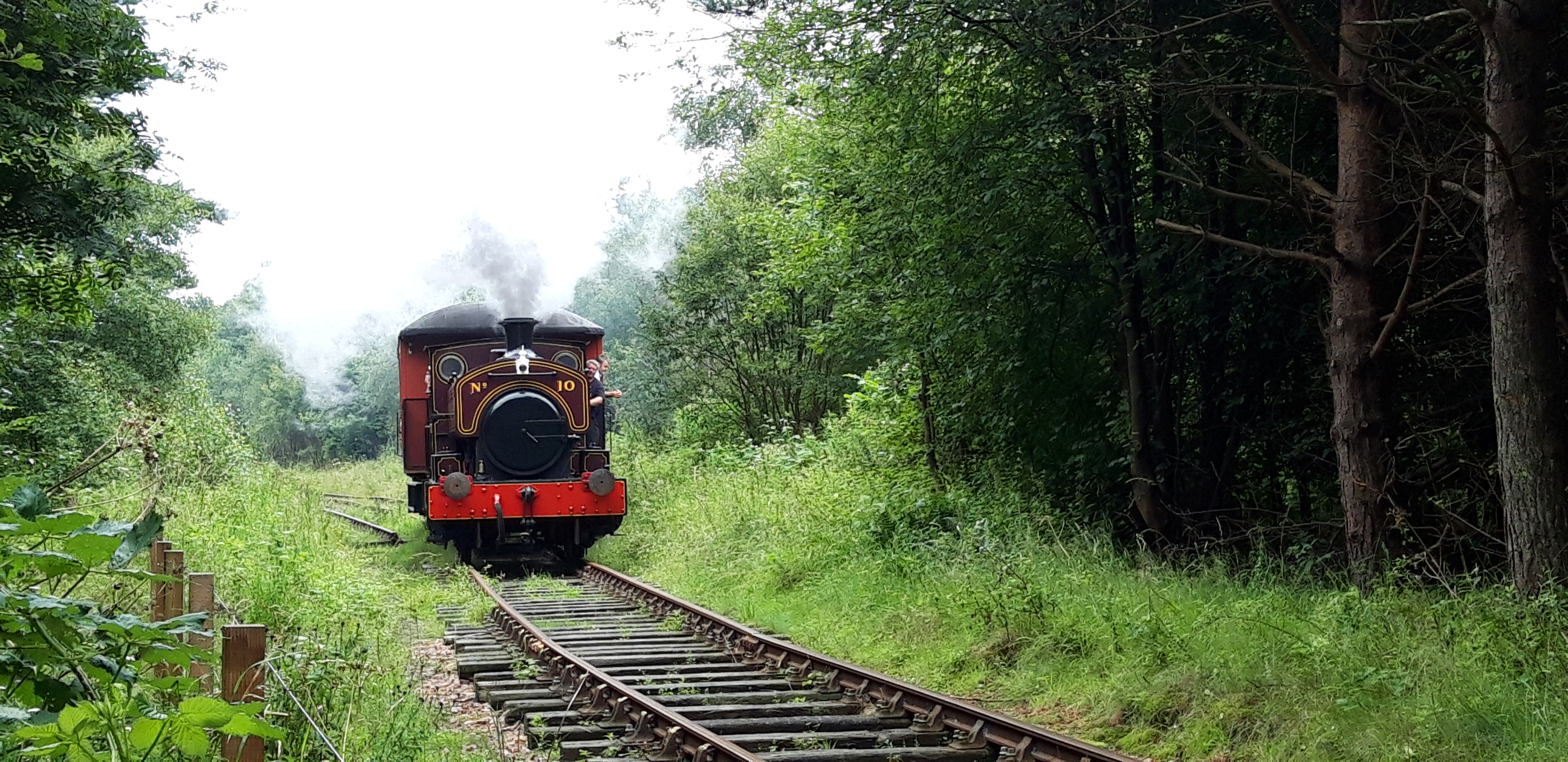

Commercial operations
- Name: Kingdom of Fife Railway Preservation Society
- Original gauge: 4 ft 8 1/2 in (1,435 mm) standard gauge

Preserved operations
- Owned by: The Kingdom of Fife Railway Preservation Society
- Length: 0.5 miles (0.80 km)

Preservation history
- 1992: The Kingdom of Fife Railway Preservation Society is formed to safeguard the Lochty Private Railway stock and find a new home.
- 1994: Last of the rolling stock at Lochty is moved to the Methil Power station until a permanent home can be found
- 2001: The KFRPS acquires Kirkland Yard.
- 2003: The stock is moved to its new home after being based at Methil Power Station since 1994
- 2008: Opened to public
- 2016: First steam locomotive completed

Fife Heritage Railway is a heritage railway run by The Kingdom of Fife Railway Preservation Society, formed in 1992, which aims to showcase the heritage of the railways of Fife and restore locomotives and rolling stock that once worked in Fife. They are based in Levenmouth, Scotland which has been their base since 2003.

== Overview ==
Following the closure of the Lochty Private Railway in 1992 due to falling passenger numbers and increased public liability premiums, the Kingdom of Fife Railway Preservation Society was quickly formed in May of that year to take over the former Lochty fleet and find a new home for them. In 1994, the last of the fleet was moved from Lochty to the now defunct Methil Power Station until the society could find a permanent home for its collection.

Various locations around Fife were looked at which included the former Crail Aerodrome, Lochore Meadows, Bowhill Colliery, part of the former Auctertool branch line, the former Wemyss Private Railway site at Scott's Road and even the former Kilconquhar railway station, all of which proved unsuitable for various reasons. In 2001 the society acquired the former Kirkland railway marshalling yard on the outskirts of Leven and in 2003, the rolling stock were moved from the Power Station to their new home. Since then the KFRPS have constructed half a mile of track plus substantial sidings, along with a two-track engine shed which is used for restoration work.

In 2016 the Fife Heritage Railway fired the first steam engine to run on a Fife heritage line since the closure of Lochty in 1992. Forth gained its boiler certificate in August which will run until 2020 when it is due for overhaul, after a brief "running in" period, Forth was brought into service during the last days of the 2016 working season. Painted in Wemyss Coal Company livery to match sister locomotives that once worked in the area, an official renaming ceremony was carried out at the start of the 2017 season by clan chief Michael Wemyss.

== Rolling stock ==
With the society's purpose of preserving locomotives and rolling stock that either worked in Fife or have a Fife connection of some kind, the society uniquely, in its certain location, has the status of having its collection being based in a fifteen-mile radius of where they were first working during their early days in Fife.

Steam Locomotives
| Number & name | Description | History | Status | Build Date | Photograph |
|---|---|---|---|---|---|
| 10 'Forth' | Andrew Barclay 0-4-0ST | Ex Granton gas works, after being removed from service it spent a short spell at Strathspey Railway before moving again to Lochty Private Railway. Upon the dissolution of Lochty Private Railway it moved into the hands of KFRPS along with other rolling stock. Restored to steam in 2016 on a short ticket, certification expires in 2020. | Operational | 1926 | |
| 21 | Andrew Barclay 0-4-0ST | Built to the Fife Area amended design for the NCB, it is one of few Barclay saddle tanks with higher water capacity, larger boiler and backhead injectors. Spending its working life around many collieries in Fife and a spell at Kinneil, finally leaving service at Frances Colliery in Dysart where it was brought into preservation at Lochty Private Railway in 1983. After spending many years out in the open, work has started with the locomotive now undergoing a major overhaul back to working order. | Under Overhaul, anticipated to take 8–10 years. | 1951 | |

Diesel Locomotives
| Number & name | Description | History | Status | Build Date | Photograph |
|---|---|---|---|---|---|
| 4 'North British' | Ruston and Hornsby 88DS 0-4-0DS | Spending most of its working life at the North British distillery in Edinburgh it came into preservation at Lochty Private Railway until dissolution in 1992 where it came into the hands of KFRPS. Currently working as part of permanent way train. | Operational | 1958 | |
| 7 | Ruston and Hornsby 165DS 0-4-0DH | Ex-Rosyth Dockyard and shares permanent way duties with ‘North British’. | Operational | 1952 | |
| 2 'The Garvie Flyer' | Ruston and Hornsby 165DE 0-4-0DE | Ex-Scottish Power Methil and recently returned to passenger services | Operational | 1960 | |
| 1 'Largo Law' | Ruston and Hornsby 165DE 0-4-0DE | Ex-Scottish Power Methil and is being used as spare parts for 'Garvie Flyer' though will likely become a static exhibit in future. | Stored, currently being cosmetically restored, stripped for parts for 'The Garvie Flyer' | 1961 | |
| 400 'River Eden' | North British 200BHP 0-4-0DH | Operational at RAF Leuchars until it was moved to Lochty Private Railway for preservation in 1986. Works as the main shunter and used on 'Driver for a Fiver' runs on open days | Operational | 1955 | |
| 10 | North British 440DH 0-6-0DH | Serving at the Michael, Wellesley and finally the Bowhill Colliery. It was brought out of service in 1974 and moved to the Lochty Private Railway. Long-term plan to restore to working order. | Stored | 1957 | |

Coaching Stock
| Number & name | Description | History | Status | Build Date | Photograph |
|---|---|---|---|---|---|
| 5010 | Norges Statsbaner Full Brake | Originally preserved at Bo'ness and Kinneil Railway, in the early days serving as a brake coach for the continental stock. It came out of use after line extensions causing gauging issues and the acquisition of BR Mk1 stock. Purchased by KFRPS in 2014 it was retrofitted with windows, vacuum breaks and Mk1 seating for use on passenger service. It is nicknamed "the Norwegian" by volunteers. | Operational | 1914 | |
| 14010 | British Rail Mark 1 Brake First Corridor | Privately owned. Used as storage but remedial work being done to ensure possibility of restoration. | Stored | 1959 | |
| 4223 | British Rail Mark 1 Tourist Second Open | Privately owned and being converted to house a model railway. Removed seating now used in coach 5010. | Converted | 1956 | |

Other Rolling Stock
| Number & name | Description | History | Status | Build Date | Photograph |
|---|---|---|---|---|---|
| DB993875 | BR 20-Ton 'Shark' Brake Van | The shark brake van was used to evenly spread ballast on the running line, in conjunction with a Dogfish ballast hopper. Refurbished in 2025, it provides additional capacity and runs with "the Norwegian". | Operational | 1957 | |
| DB987132 | BR ZCV Plaice Wagon | One of the society's first restoration projects, it finds good use with the p/way team. | Operational | 1979 | |
| 7948 | SGD 20-Ton grain wagon | Serving the Scottish Grain Distillers at Cameron Brig, it is now being having a cosmetic overhaul for eventual museum display. | Under Restoration | N/A | |
| 7926 | SGD 20-Ton grain wagon | Serving the Scottish Grain Distillers at Cameron Brig, it is being converted into a ballast hopper. | Under conversion | 1937 | |
| 202.DB47112 | William Briggs & sons 14-Ton Bitumen Wagon | Built by Hurst Nelson of Motherwell for Briggs Camperdown refinery in Dundee. Donated to the Fife Railway Preservation Society (later KFRPS) at Lochty in the 70's. It moved with other stock on relocation to Kirkland yard. Recently has been converted to being a water carrier for steam locomotive working | Operation | 1955 | |
| 21117 | NBR Non-Vent Van | The oldest item of rolling stock on site, privately owned. Requiring some restoration work but stored inside for safety with the plans to be restored for museum display. | Stored | 1901 | |
| 313121 | British Rail Class 313 | Formerly used by Network Rail to test and assist in the installation of European Rail Traffic Management System on the Hertford Loop line, it was acquired in 2023. It seldom appears publicly at open events, but is planned to be converted into a public exhibition. | Under restoration | 1976 | |

== Future Plans ==
The current object for the society is raise its profile by introducing steam trains on their current branch along with Kirkland built up as a museum for Fife's railway heritage which looks to include a display building to be built in the not too distant future, along with a second steam locomotive. Work has started to restore a second steam locomotive to work alongside the current working locomotive, Forth. With recent developments of the reopening of the Levenmouth rail link in 2024, the society hope to become a larger tourist attraction for the Levenmouth area and Fife as a whole.
