= Kirkland High School and Community College =

Coordinates: 56.1881°N 3.0208°W

Kirkland High School

Location
- Methil Brae; Methil, KY8 3LT; Scotland

Information
- Type: Secondary
- Motto: Learning for Life
- Established: 1963
- Status: Closed
- Closed: June 2016
- Local authority: Fife Council
- Head teacher: Ronnie Ross (final)
- Staff: c. 83 (at closure)
- Gender: Co-educational
- Age: 11 to 18
- Enrolment: c. 420 (at closure)
- Houses: Caldcoits, Kinnarchie & Pirnie
- Colours: Red, Gold & Blue
- Publication: School Prospectus
- Website: http://www.fife.gov.uk/atoz/index.cfm?fuseaction=facility.display&facid=A0D7EB11-DD7C-4A51-9C16FFB1159EE4D1

Kirkland High School (formerly known as Kirkland High School and Community College and Kirkland Junior High School) was a six-year comprehensive school in Methil that served the population in the Levenmouth area, Scotland. From January 2005 until June 2016 the head teacher was Ronnie Ross. In June 2012 Fife Council proposed that the school should merge with neighbouring Buckhaven High School to create Levenmouth Academy. The plans were approved in April 2014 and the new school opened to pupils on 17 August 2016. In September 2015 the student roll was 421, less than half of the roll of 900 the school had in 2000.

== History ==
The Kirkland Junior High School was established in 1963 to accommodate the extra influx of pupils to the existing Aberhill Secondary. It was built on the 13th-century land of Michael of Methil, a relative of the famous MacDuff. It was officially opened in 1965. The school had served alongside Buckhaven High School as the high schools for the Levenmouth area since the closure of Aberhill Secondary. In 1970, it became a fully comprehensive school.

In 1990, a community college was opened within the school, from then on known as Kirkland High School and Community College. In 2006, the school was made one of the Scottish Government's Schools of Ambition.

The school had three houses, 'Caldcoits', 'Kinnarchie' and 'Pirnie'. However, due to reduced numbers on the school roll, in the last few years of the school's operation, only the latter two houses were used in the system.

In 2015, the Kirkland College was closed, in preparation for the move to the new Levenmouth Campus. The college merged with Fife College, who were built their own specialised facility on the grounds of the new school, meaning that the Levenmouth Campus is the largest of its kind in Scotland, educating over 2,000 students in total.

The buildings were vacated by pupils in July 2016. Demolition work on the old facilities was scheduled for September 2016, beginning with the former games hall. The site was completely demolished by December 2016.

In 2023, the Methil Care Village was completed on the site previously occupied by the school. The care village features 35 bungalows for the elderly and people with specific needs, a 36-bed care home, and a nursery.

=== Headteachers ===
- 1963 - 1966: William Reid
- 1966 - 1977: Dai Davies
- 1977 - 1979: J. F. Strang
- 1979 - 1983: Thomas Dalgleish
- 1983 - 1985: Jack Yuile
- 1989 - 1997: Gerry Coyle
- 1997 - 2005: Ken Robertson
- 2005 - 2016: Ronnie Ross

=== Notable pupils ===
- Jack Vettriano, painter
- William Curley, chocolatier and patissier
- Nathan Austin, footballer

== School dress code ==
=== Attire ===
Girls wore dark skirt or trousers, white or dark top, and dark footwear. Boys wore dark trousers, white or dark top, and dark footwear.

=== School ties ===
Wearing a school tie at all times was encouraged and enforced by staff to promote uniformity and identifiability. At the start of first year, each pupil received a complimentary school tie.
