= Methil Docks =

Coordinates: 56.1849°N 3.0053°W

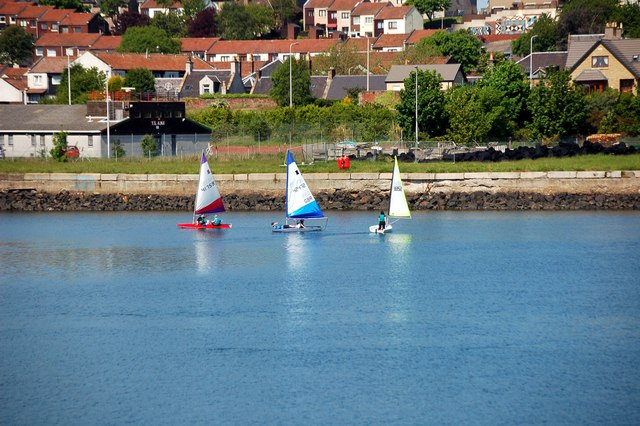
No. 3 Dock

The Methil Docks are situated in Methil, Fife, Scotland, on the northern shores of the Firth of Forth. Historically, the docks served as a port for the transport of coal cargoes. However, since the decline of the mining industry of Fife, the port now specialises as a wood pulp and timber distribution centre.

== History ==
No. 1 dock was built by Cunningham, Blythe and Westland and completed May 1887. No.2 dock was completed in January 1900 and No. 3 dock was built by Sir Robert McAlpine and completed in 1913. No.3 dock closed in 1977. Plans in the early 2000s to convert the area into a network of restaurants and social space fell through due to a lack of funds. The project, provisionally named Methil Ramblas, would have included al fresco dining, cafes, and open-air fitness sessions.
