= Wemyss Private Railway =

Former railway line in Scotland

The Wemyss Private Railway was a network of lines, sometimes known as the Wemyss Estate Railway. The lines were a group of mineral and other railways in Fife, Scotland, mainly on the land of the Wemyss family. They were built to connect coal pits to harbours and the railway network, for the use of tenants of the estate. The Wemyss and Buckhaven Railway was built at the expense of the Wemyss Estate and carried passengers; it was later sold to the North British Railway.

When numerous collieries needed a railway connection the Wemyss Estate built a connecting line to Methil Harbour and improved the harbour itself. The local network became known as the Wemyss Private Railway and the estate's interest was transferred to the Wemyss Coal Company. These terms have been used interchangeably by authors.

The collieries were nationalised in 1947 and the sidings connections at the pits followed; the main line railways of Great Britain were nationalised in 1948, but the central section, now known as the Wemyss Private Railway remained in private hands. However the mineral activity in East Fife declined and in 1970 the Wemyss Private Railway closed down.

== History ==
=== The Wemyss Family ===
The family of Wemyss was "unquestionably the oldest on the County", tracing its line back to Michael Wemyss, who died in 1165. In 1633 the title of Earl of Wemyss was bestowed, but the heir to the title, David Lord Elcho engaged in the Rebellion of 1745, and was later attainted, and was unable to succeed to the title. A junior branch of the family succeeded, and in 1820 James Erskine Wemyss became the head of the family. He died in 1854, and was succeeded by James Hay Erskine Wemyss. On his death in 1864 his eldest son Randolph Gordon Erskine Wemyss (1858 - 1908) was heir to the lairdship at the age of six. It was in trust until his majority; the trustees managed the affairs of the estate, led by his mother.

The estate comprised very extensive lands in the County of Fife, and coal was mined on estate lands from, at the latest, the eighteenth century. Randolph Wemyss was possessed of an exceptionally dynamic business mind and developed the mineral extraction; as he did so it emerged that huge quantities of winnable coal lay under the lands of the estate.

=== Before railways ===
Coal had been worked in Fife for many centuries, probably since the thirteenth century. As well as its household use it was extensively used for salt panning; sea water was evaporated by heating to produce salt, an essential commodity, and in the sixteenth century the area around Methil and Wemyss had the most extensive group of salt pans in Fife, all belonging to the Wemyss Estate.

Coal and salt were exported, and several primitive waggonways were established to bring the coal to the shore. There were many places on the coast where boats could take on cargo, but it was only in the nineteenth century that harbours were developed.

Tubs were hauled on rails within the pits, although they can not be considered railways; notable among these was the inclined plane in the Wemyss no. 7 pit which ran out under the Firth of Forth from West Wemyss, from 1824. It was a single track operated by steam engine and haulage cable; as workings at various levels were served, branches were made at those levels. Because of the gradient of the incline, 29 degrees, ordinary turnout connections were not possible as the trams would tip sideways on the turnout; a form of drawbridge was used to make the connections.

Before 1856 the Victoria Pit and Barcraig Pit, respectively west and east of the little harbour of West Wemyss, were connected to it by short tramways. It is likely that these were hutch roads, along which the tubs used underground were conveyed, propelled by manpower or horses; they were almost certainly narrow gauge.

=== First railways ===
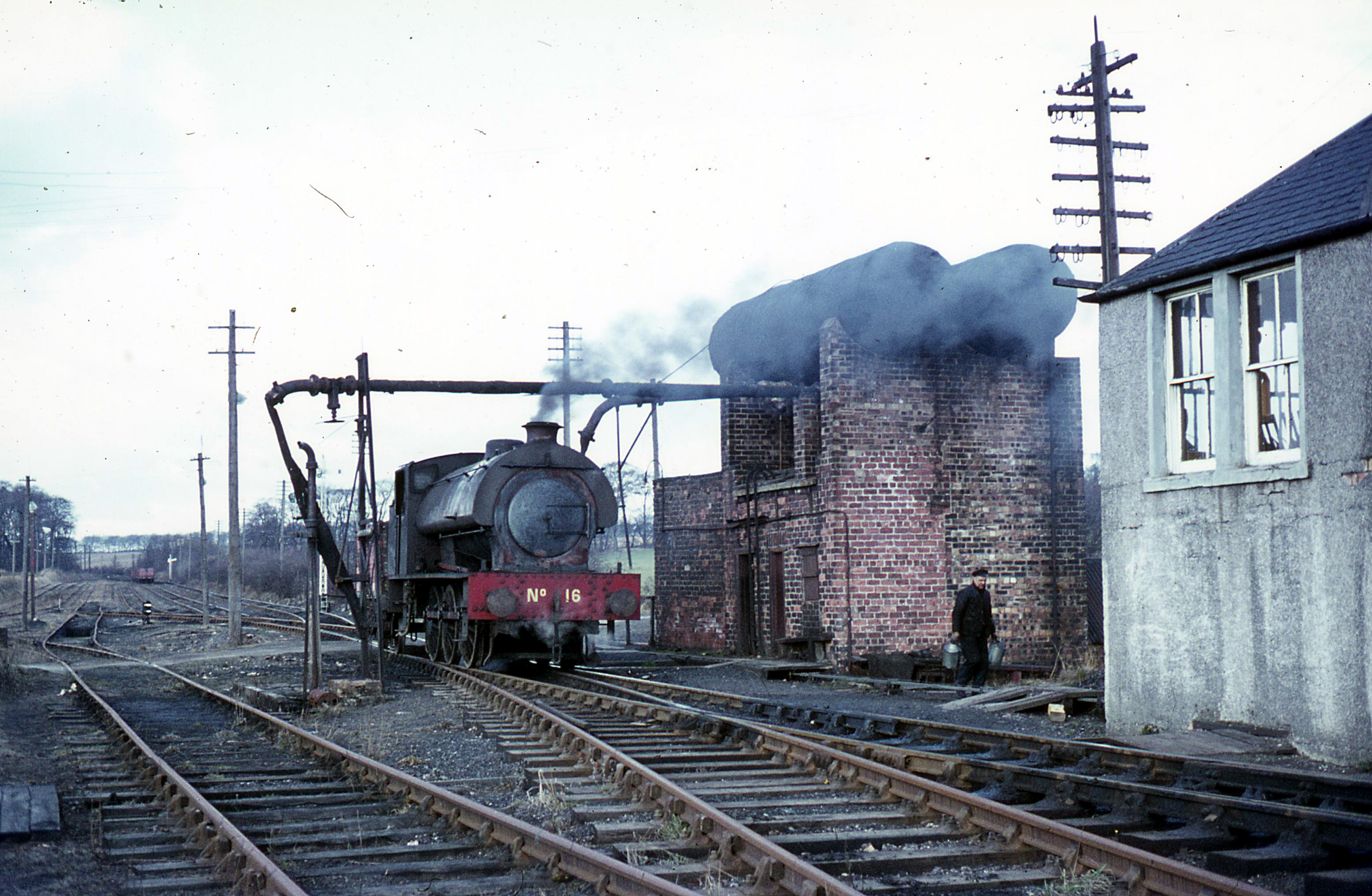
0-6-0 locomotive No 16 taking water near East Wemyss in 1970.

The mineral workings had long been established using shipping when the first railways came to the area, and the railways did not immediately serve the coal workings, concentrating instead on agricultural and industrial centres. The Edinburgh and Northern Railway was authorised in 1845 to build from Burntisland to Perth and Dundee (reached by ferry), and after a name change to the Edinburgh, Perth and Dundee Railway (EP&DR), it opened its line in the years 1847 to 1848, running broadly south to north through Thornton. A line ran westward from Thornton to Dunfermline, also a rich coalfield area, in 1848 - 1849.

The Leven Railway opened in 1854 connecting Leven with the EP&DR at Thornton; the Leven Railway saw the long-term future as extending to Anstruther and serving the fishing communities. The objective was achieved in 1863 after amalgamation with the East of Fife Railway, the two companies together forming the Leven and East of Fife Railway in 1861. They were absorbed by the North British Railway (NBR) in 1877. The region east of Anstruther remained unconnected for some years until the Anstruther and St Andrews Railway opened its line in 1883 - 1887; together these lines formed the Fife Coast Railway.

The first direct railway connection to serve a colliery was opened at the end of 1868 when the Muiredge branch opened by the Leven and East of Fife Railway; it left the main line at Cameron Bridge and ran south for a little over a mile. The Muiredge Colliery was immediately north of Buckhaven; it was revived by Bowman and Cairns, having earlier been worked by the Wemyss Estate, but the earlier activity had not been profitable and had lapsed. There was a public goods station at Muiredge in addition to the colliery connection. The branch opened shortly before 20 December 1868. The act of Parliament authorising the branch, the Leven and East of Fife Railway Act 1866 (29 & 30 Vict. c. clxvii), had included a branch to Methil Harbour, but this was not carried out. It is likely that a mineral siding connection was made to the Pirnie Pit at this time; Pirnie is on the east side of the branch a short distance away. (The pit became called Leven no. 3 in November 1877 and North British Railway engines came to the pit and extended sidings there.)

Muiredge coal was moved by rail northwards to Cameron Bridge, and there was no satisfactory rail connection to any nearby harbour at the time. There was much demand for transfer to shipping, and Bowman and Cairns decided to construct a direct mineral railway to Methil; they built it from May 1869, running down Muiredge Den and along the foreshore to Methil West Pier. Horse traction on the single line was used at first but a locomotive was employed by 1870. The line was 1 1/4 miles long.

In 1872–1873 the Hugo pit became productive; it was in high land above West Wemyss, and an inclined tunnel was dug, down which hutches of coal were lowered on a double track rope worked inclined plane, of 25 inches gauge. At the lower end of the tunnel the plane reached the small harbour of West Wemyss, already reached by the Victoria and Barncraig hutch tramways. An enlargement of West Wemyss Harbour was made at this time too, starting in 1872 and completed in September 1873.

=== Leven Harbour developments ===
The improvement at West Wemyss was welcome, but it remained a small and inconvenient harbour, and the absence of any modern facility in the area led eventually to the formation of the Leven Harbour Dock and Railway Company by the Leven Harbour Act 1876 (39 & 40 Vict. c. clxxiii) on 24 July 1876. As well as construction of a wet dock at Leven, the company was to build a five furlong railway from the Leven and East of Fife Railway at Leven station. The construction cost £40,000 and was completed in November 1879. The branch railway was worked by the North British Railway, which by this time had taken over the Leven and East of Fife Railway company. From the outset Leven Harbour suffered from silting and continuous dredging was required, and it was not profitable.

=== The Wemyss and Buckhaven Railway ===
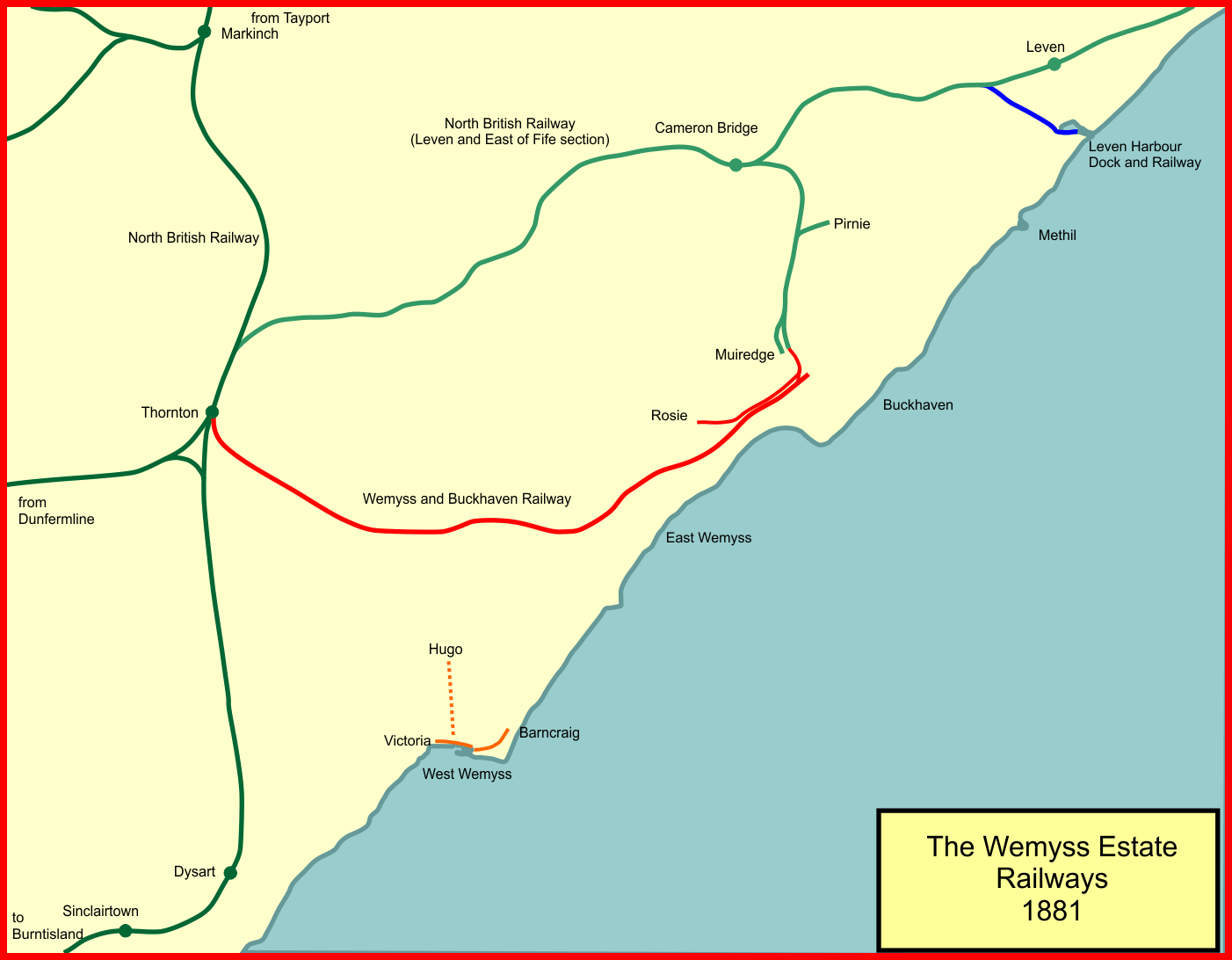
The Wemyss Estate Railways in 1881

If this move was intended to free the Wemyss Estate coal masters from their constraints it failed, for the North British Railway continued to be the sole haulier for coal from any distance, and Leven Harbour was unsatisfactory, and not easily reached by rail from many of the East Fife pits. Several other small harbours were developed, but this too failed to resolve the problem, and in any case numerous new pits had been opened remote from the existing railway. In May 1874 a committee of coalmasters discussed building their own line to the developing Methil Dock, a little west of Leven. Nothing came of this discussion at first, but in 1878 a definite scheme was produced to connect Buckhaven with Thornton. Thornton was chosen as the junction because of the convenience of bringing coal from Dunfermline.

Matters progressed and on 17 October 1879 a certificate for the construction of the railway was issued by the Board of Trade; an act of Parliament was not required because no compulsory land acquisition was needed and there were no objections to the scheme; nor was a new joint stock company to be established. (Note: This arrangement had been enacted by the Railway Construction Facilities Act 1864.) It was to be financed by the Wemyss Estate.

The line was a little over four miles long; by the end of 1880 a demonstration goods train was run, but the line was not properly finished, and the Board of Trade inspection took place on 30 July 1881, by Major General Hutchinson. With some qualifications, the line was passed as fit for passenger operation, and it opened formally on 1 August 1881 although public services did not start until 8 August. It was worked by the North British Railway. There were intermediate stations at West Wemyss (at the present-day Standing Stane Road) and Wemyys Castle, close to the town of East Wemyss. It had private accommodation for Wemyss and his family.

A short branch was made at the end of 1880 or early in 1881 to join the NBR Muiredge branch, and a connection from the new Rosie pit, which ran as a high level siding parallel to, and above, the W&B line.

In 1882 the Duncan pit started operation, near West Wemyss station, and a short branch was built to serve it, opening in 1882. It was built by the NBR at Wemyss' expense, and the output was conveyed to Burntisland. Lady Lilian pit resumed operation (on the site of an earlier unsuccessful scheme) in 1891 - 1893 and the Duncan sidings were extended eastwards to serve it, and at the same time the line was extended south to reach the Hugo pit, which previously had only been able to access West Wemyss through the hutch tunnel.

=== Improving Methil harbour ===
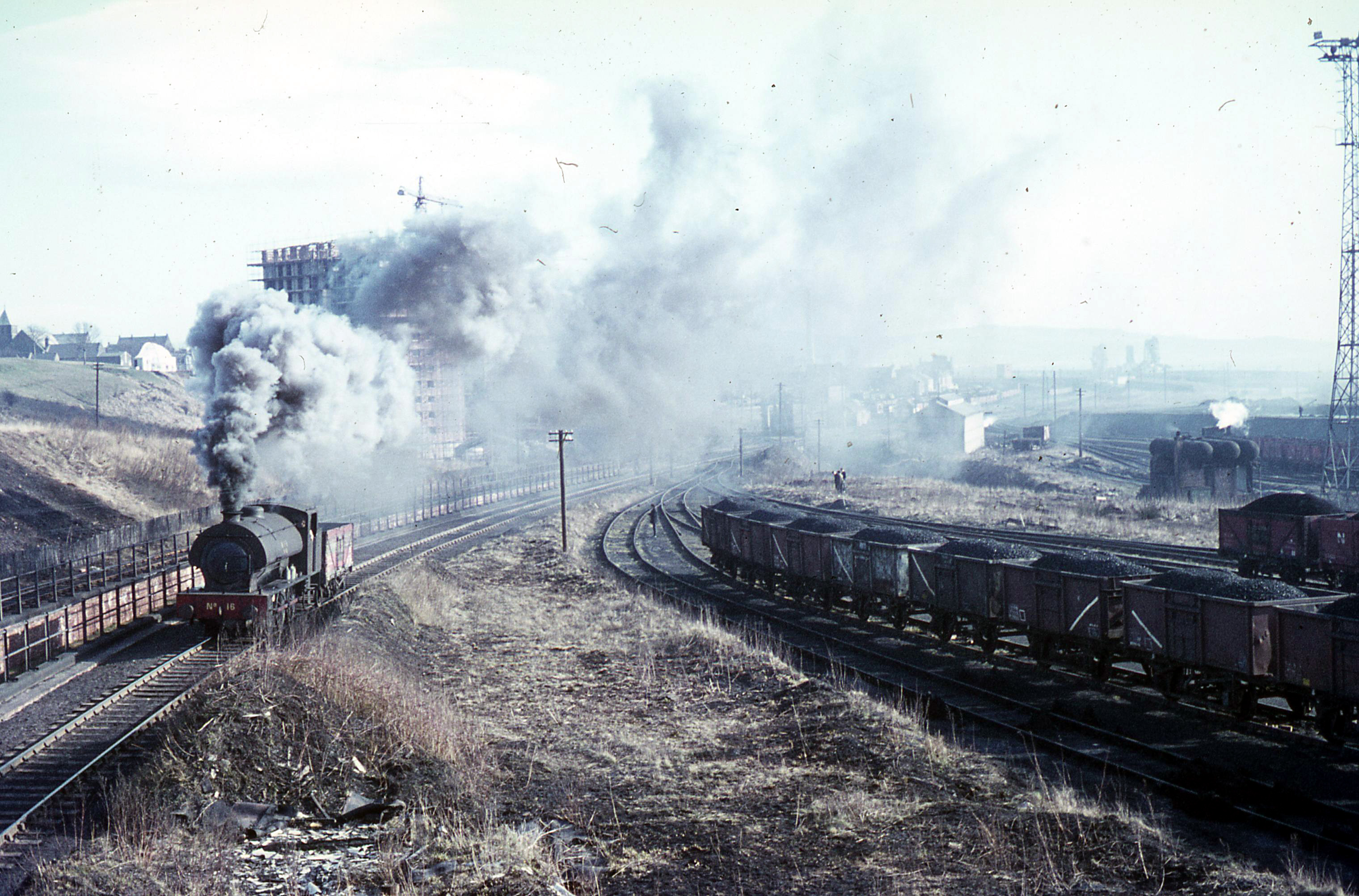
0-6-0 locomotive No 16 near Methil docks in 1970.

The North British Railway (NBR) had developed Burntisland as its main harbour in Fife, and much of the rail-connected coal traffic went there; this was a considerable mileage, and income to the NBR, and local coalmasters resented the expense when there were several small harbours locally that were not used.

The dock accommodation at Methil was very limited, being only capable of handling ships up to 150 tons. As the rate of coal extraction increased, the lack of useful local harbour facilities became of increasing significance, and in 1879 Wemyss and his tenant coalmasters agreed on the construction of a proper dock at Methil. To avoid opposition from the Leven Harbour Company, Wemyys approached them to purchase their business. They were receptive, as all their initial capital had been expended and further construction was needed, which they were unable to fund. Struggling with heavy indebtedness, the company sold out to the Wemyss Estate (Randolph Wemyss, his tenant colliers and certain other business interests) in 1883 for £12,000. By this purchase the Wemyss Estate acquired the branch railway to Leven Harbour.

Wemyss needed to extend the Buckhaven line to Leven Harbour, and strong opposition might be expected from the North British Railway, who would lose mileage by it. Wemyss forged an agreement with them, finalised on 21 April 1883, by agreeing to the Burntisland carriage rates applying to coal traffic from outside the immediate area to Methil and Leven. Wemyss also agreed not to allow competing railways access to the area over his lands; the North British anticipated an incursion by the rival Caledonian Railway and this may have been significant in securing their consent to Wemyss' line.

The line to extend the Buckhaven line to Leven Harbour, which became known as the Leven Connection Railway, two miles long, opened on 17 September 1884. Parliamentary authorisation was not required. The line was inspected by Major General Hutchinson on 3 March 1887 and opened to passenger traffic on 5 May 1887, operating as an extension of the Wemyss and Buckhaven line; passenger trains ran between Thornton, Buckhaven and Methil; only mineral traffic continued to Leven Harbour, but the new, well-equipped Methil Dock opened on 5 May 1887 also. The cost of the dock and railway extension had been £227,000. (Note: Bruce says that the dock cost £100,000, a remarkably small figure.) In eight months of 1887 Methil shipped 220,000 tons, rising to 409,000 in the full year 1888; Burntisland throughput fell substantially in the same period. Meanwhile, by 1890 Leven was not shipping anything.

A link line was built from the Leven nos 1 and 2 pits branch to join the new line near Methil. There was a significant difference in levels and the link line descended at 1 in 19; a runaway trap siding was provided to protect the main line.

=== Thornton avoiding line ===
The mineral traffic built up rapidly, and included heavy flows from Dunfermline. The routing for those trains involved a reversal at Thornton, on the NBR main line, and this caused significant delay; a direct line passing under the main line was built in 1886 - 1887; it had steep gradients, falling from the Dunfermline direction at 1 in 52 and rising again at 1 in 74. Wemyss contributed £1,000 to the cost of construction.

=== Wellsgreen pit ===
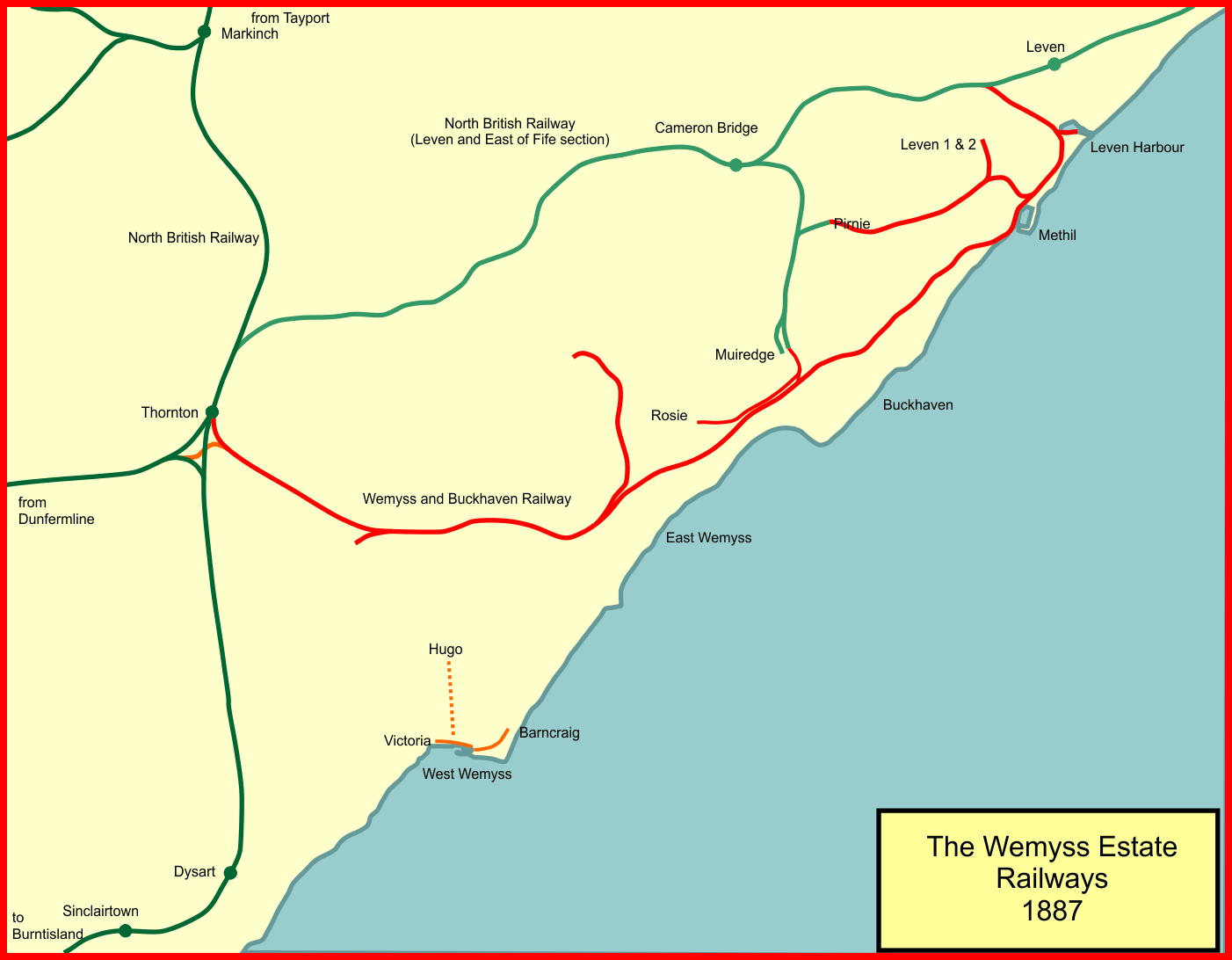
The Wemyss Estate Railways in 1887

Shortly after October 1887 a lease was agreed between Wemyss and the Fife Coal Company for the exploitation of a pit at Wellsgreen; this too would need a railway connection. Wemyss required that to join his lines at Wemyss Castle station, by agreement with the NBR; the branch ran south from the colliery.

=== Randolph pit ===
After September 1888 production at the Randolph pit started; there was consideration of making a mineral railway eastward from it to join the Duncan connection on the W&BR, but this would have been a lengthy line and in fact a direct connection was made with the NBR main line adjacent.

=== Transfer to the North British Railway ===
The new Methil dock was entirely successful, and mechanical handling equipment and other modern aids ensured rapid loading of shipping. Nonetheless, Wemyss did not wish to be a long term operator of harbour facilities, particularly because he foresaw that considerable development would be needed in later years to keep abreast of the expansion of trade. Discussions took place with the North British Railway in 1888 which resulted in the sale of the facilities to that company. This became effective on 1 February 1889 and included the Wemyss and Buckhaven line and the Methil extension, the Methil and Leven docks, and the railways serving them. Wemyss undertook never to construct or allow a railway or dock on his lands that would compete with the transferred lines and harbours. This was a most significant concession, as he was handing monopoly control to the NBR; at the time he had an excellent relationship with the chairman of the NBR, John Walker, and this may have influenced him. The purchase cost £225,000; the Wemyss Castle station was to be maintained by the NBR for the private use of Wemyss, and Wemyss was given a seat on the NBR board.

=== Methil dock expansion ===
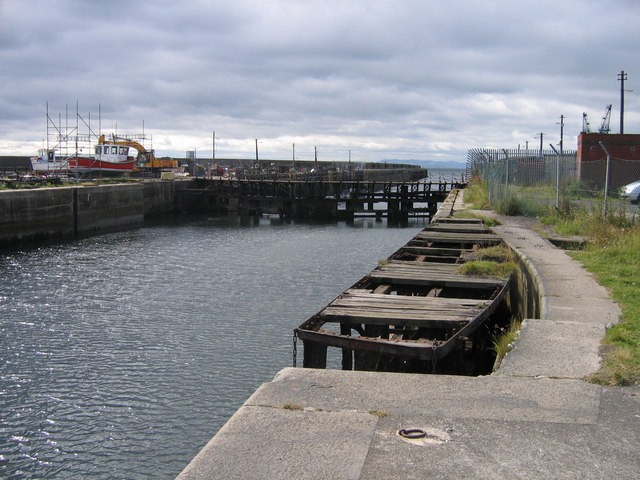
No 3 dock at Methil in 2007.

Wemyss had an understanding with Walker and the NBR that they would develop Methil Docks and the railway facilities in line with the growth of exported minerals, and a second dock basin at Methil was planned. However Walker died suddenly on 24 April 1891, and his successor John Conacher was considerably less amenable to Wemyss' intentions. The NBR had been spending money on developing Burntisland harbour, and Conacher saw the attraction in avoiding duplication and taking the profit in the longer haul from Wemyss' estates to Burntisland.

Accordingly, the NBR failed to carry out any significant improvement at Methil. Wemyss and his tenants found that the limitations of the harbour were unreasonably constraining their businesses: ships suffering 14 days waiting in the roads for a berth and five days to load were recorded as typical. The NBR harbour at Burntisland was unattractive to the East Fife coalmasters, but for some time Wemyss was unable to persuade the NBR to attend to the issue, although he pressed Conacher to agree to build the new works at Methil, in a series of meetings and increasingly urgent letters in 1893.

In the face of this pressure the NBR started work on the No. 2 Dock at Methil in 1894; it took until January 1900 to get it ready.

=== The Wemyss Coal Company Ltd ===
Until this time Wemyss had been financing his businesses in a personal capacity, but on 17 March 1894 the Wemyss Coal Company Ltd (WCC) was formed. Wemyss transferred much of his business interest to the company; other shareholders were chiefly local coalmasters. Naturally Wemyss was a dominant shareholder and a driving force; his later correspondence with the NBR often put forward his views personally as well as on behalf of the WCC. (The Wemyss Colliery Trust was established on 28 October 1897, taking possession of all the colliery interests in the estate by perpetual feu.)

=== New pits and railways ===
In 1894 considerable further development of the pits took place, and in particular a pit later named Michael Colliery on the foreshore west of East Wemyss town was established, intended to win undersea coal. A new railway was planned, climbing from the new pit to form a triangular junction with a new line running between West Wemyss and Wemyss Castle, and broadly parallel to the existing Buckhaven line. The new railway was over a mile long, with a zigzag to gain height and gradients of 1 in 69 against loaded trains to reach the high level line. Construction of the line started in February 1895, and was complete in October 1895.

=== The Burntisland thirling agreement ===
From 1894 difficult discussions took place between the NBR and the Wemyss Estate and its coalmaster tenants. The NBR was continuing to advance the benefits of developing Burntisland, and Wemyss as a Director of the NBR was heartily opposed to that as being wasteful for the NBR. His position was anomalous as his interests in the WCC were also contrary to any development of harbours elsewhere than at Methil. Conacher and a section of the NBR directors favoured Burntisland and were reluctant to expend money on developing Methil. The negotiations ended on 20 February 1896 with a thirling agreement (that is, a mutually binding limitation agreement) in which the coalmasters and Wemyss himself undertook for 21 years to ship all their coal from NBR harbours, and not to condone the construction of any rival railway wholly or partly in Fife. Short private colliery railway connections were allowed under the agreement. (Note: The NBR undertook not to raise the haulage rates to Methil above those to Burntisland, but Brotchie is vague about what the Wemyss Estate got in return for their agreement; the schedule refers to the development of Burntisland, contrary to their interests.)

In May 1897 Wemyss indicated to the NBR that he planned to build a new connecting railway from Muiredge Den to Methil; at six miles in length it was to connect numerous collieries in the district. The NBR immediately took the view that this was prohibited under the thirling agreement, and lengthy and antagonistic correspondence followed. The NBR argued that the licence to build new colliery connections was personal to Wemyss (not the WCC) and did not allow him to carry the minerals of others on the line. The matter went to arbitration, and the arbitrator gave his decision on 10 March 1899: he found in favour of Wemyss. The NBR complied with the obligations of the finding, but continued to try to dissuade Wemyss from building the line by proposing concessions on the continued use of the NBR lines.

This involved an attempt to make an agreement with Wemyss that would pay him £3,000 annually as a form of compensation, but Wemyss declined the agreement. Although the matter only affected a six-mile mineral railway, it proved extremely contentious for the North British Railway board, and at a turbulent shareholders' meeting on 23 March 1899, a critical vote resulted in the resignation of the chairman. Wemyss' own position as a NBR board member was becoming impossible and he resigned from the board on 16 May 1899. Conacher too, the General Manager of the NBR, was accused of dishonest management, and he resigned as from 1 July 1899.

=== Wemyss' remarriage ===
In July 1898 Wemyss was divorced by his wife, having had intimate relations in London with an actress. He married Lady Eva Cecilia Wellesley on 28 November 1899 and sailed to Egypt and South Africa on honeymoon. The Second Boer War had just started, and Wemyss became involved as an army officer and was absent while matters developed at home.

=== The new Muiredge line ===
The contentious new railway between Muiredge Den and Methil was started in October 1899; it was completed and opened in January 1901. It was six miles in length, and single track, starting in the west at Duncan siding, linking Lochhead and Hugo pits, with a new east-facing connection to Michael. It then crossed the Wemyss and Buckhaven line and turned north up Wemyss Den, running close to the 1887 Wellsgreen line, then crossing it by a diamond crossing; the earlier restrictive agreements required Wellsgreen traffic to be worked to Wemyss Castle. It then ran north and east, joining the Bowman branch to Isabella pit, and then crossing the route of the NBR Muiredge branch. Running north-south this had become dormant when more direct routes for Muiredge coal had been built, and the NBR had agreed that it might be severed to allow the new line to pass through west to east. Spur connections north and south were made to the stubs of that line; the junction area was known as Muiredge Plunks. The line continued east through Starkey's Wood, turning tightly to the south-west and crossing over the Methil extension railway, to terminate at Denbeath pit on the shore.

The line had cost £17,186; it was formally opened on 9 January 1901.

Wemyss returned from South Africa in July 1901 and proposed an arrangement to carry the Wellsgreen traffic on the new line. Until that time it had been routed to Wemyss Castle and carried by the NBR. A new eastward spur from the Wellsgreen branch was provided, shortening the transit to Methil considerably. However the NBR reminded Wemyss of the earlier agreement that Wellsgreen traffic would travel via Wemyss Castle, and after some prevarication Wemyss was obliged to concede that obligation in August 1903.

=== Pits at Earlseat ===
Wemyss now set about connecting pits at Earlseat, where a considerable coal resource lay. A new branch was built from the Muiredge line running north parallel to the FCC Wellsgreen line, passing round the east and north sides of Wellsgreen and then striking west to Earlseat. The line was 2 1/2 miles long, and starting in July 1903, it was completed in four months. The location of the new pit was remote, and Wemyss established a free workers' passenger train service, erecting platforms at Earlseat and at Cowley Road, Methil, and at Denbeath.

On 12 August 1907 a serious accident took place at Spence's Box at the Summer Road crossing; the workers' train was waiting at the junction signal for a clear road, and a descending loaded mineral train got out of control and ran through the signals, destroying the pug engine and carriages of the workers' train. The approach of the out-of-control train was given warning and most of the passengers and crew had left the train.

=== Consolidation of the Wemyss Coal Company business ===
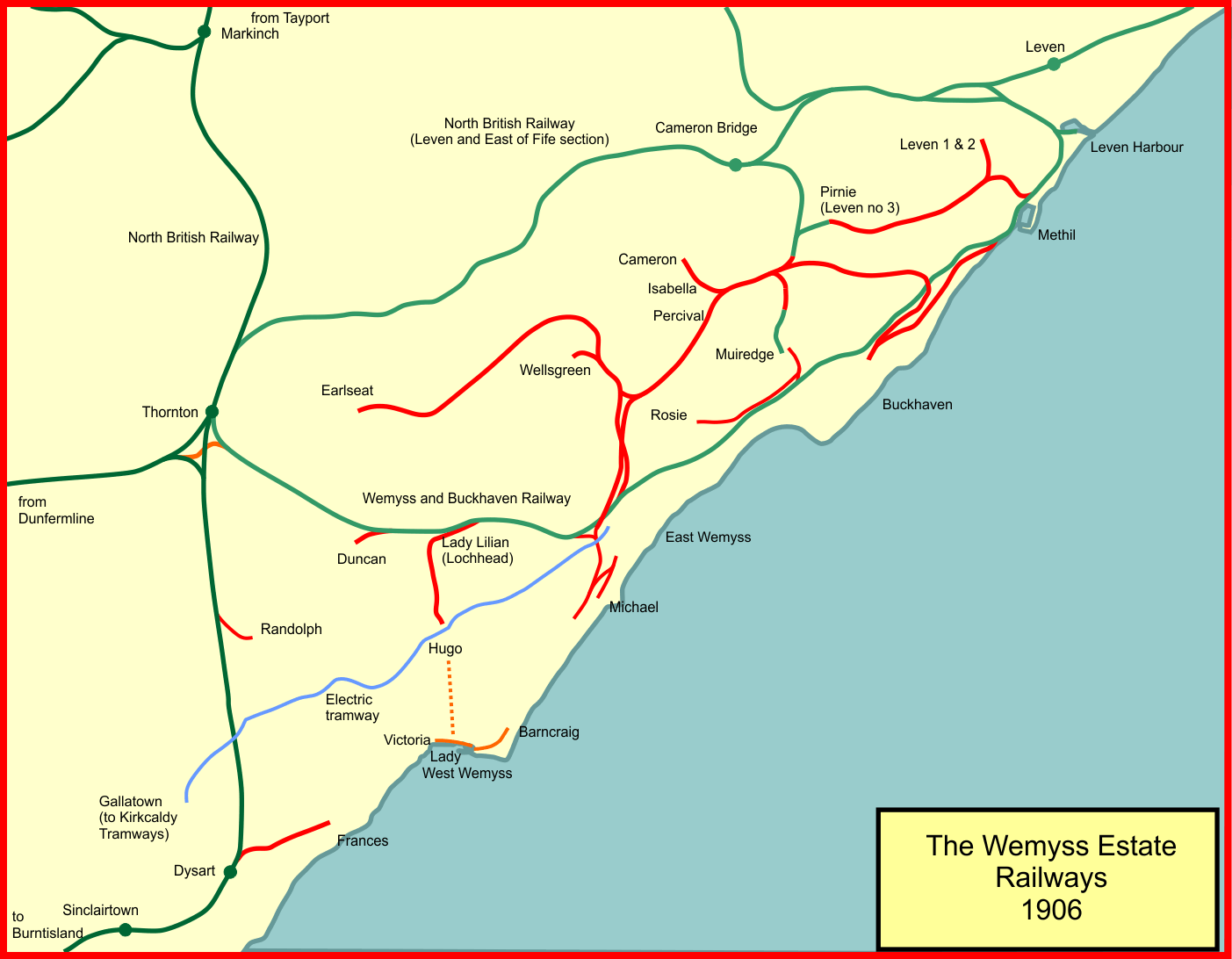
The Wemyss Estate Railways in 1906

From 1894 the possible absorption by the Wemyss Coal Company (WCC) of the activity of the coalmaster Bowman was discussed, but Bowman's price was considered too much. In 1905 most of Bowman's leases expired and the WCC took over the work directly at that time.

The Estate Railway then consisted of 8 miles of running line and 18 miles of sidings. Although now entirely mineral lines, modern signalling systems were in use for the intensive traffic.

=== Methil harbour extension, again ===
In 1895 Methil harbour had shipped 727,564 tons, overtaking Burntisland, and abstracting some business from smaller ports which could not accept the larger vessels coming into use. From 1904 a further increase in shipments from Methil was expected, and the no. 2 dock was already smaller than many of the vessels currently in use. W. F. Jackson had succeeded Conacher as General Manager of the North British Railway, owner of the docks, and he too seems to have been antagonistic to Wemyss. Widening and deepening the shipping access to Methil was, he said, impractical, and Wemyss replied in a letter stating that he had prepared a scheme that could be implemented, but that if the NBR would not act on the matter, Wemyss would build a new dock himself. His original undertaking not to do so had been, he said, contingent on the NBR extending and enlarging the dock themselves as might be necessary.

Further acrimonious correspondence followed, the result of which was that the NBR declined to improve the Methil docks, while Wemyss threatened, for the time being in vain, to build an additional dock facility himself. However, in the 1905 parliamentary session he deposited a bill for a Wemyss Dock at Buckhaven. The Lords committee refused the preamble, on the grounds of his undertaking to the NBR, and that no one else was precluded from taking the necessary steps. In the following year the NBR, stung into action by the finding, presented a proposal themselves but it ran out of time for the 1906 session and was deposited in April 1907. At the same time, Wemyss, possibly suspecting tactical play, submitted a modified version of his own scheme, while stating that he had no wish to proceed with it if the NBR would itself improve Methil.

So it was that on 2 August 1907 the bill passed and became the North British Railway Act 1907 (7 Edw. 7. c. ciii) was passed, empowering the North British Railway to construct Methil no. 3 Dock and associated railway connections; the NBR was required to complete it as soon as possible. Wemyss withdrew his bill, and in 1908 the NBR let a contract to Robert McAlpine for the no. 3 Dock. It was to be located east of the earlier docks and was undoubtedly very large. The single track crossing of the River Leven was to be widened to four tracks, and considerable additional sidings accommodation was to be provided. The railway facilities alone were to cost £50,000. As part of the scheme, Leven Harbour, already badly silted up, was closed.

In 1913 coal exports reached a total of 3,224,000 tons, of which two-thirds was handled by the Wemyss Estate Railway.

=== The Wemyss and District Tramways Company ===
The huge and concentrated mining activity obviously required a considerable manpower. The WCC had early on provided miners' houses, but now travel from outside the immediate area was a necessity. Wemyss decided to install an electric passenger tramway, linked to the existing Kirkcaldy municipal system, for the use of employees. It opened in August 1906; it was 3 ft 6in gauge and cost Wemyss personally £52,000; he formed the Wemyss and District Tramways Company Ltd to operate it. It ran 7 1/2 miles from Gallatown to Leven via Coaltown, East Wemyss, Roisie, Muiredge, Denbeath and Methil. Electricity generated for the Wellesley mines was used on the system. The trams ran into the Kirkcaldy system and were integrated with it, but there were four high-capacity cars reserved for the times of shift changes

The original alignment passed through the centre of Coaltown, but following a serious accident there, the line was diverted round the northern margin of the community.

In 1912 the tramway company passed into the ownership of the Balfour Beatty group, but for a while the four high capacity cars remained with the WCC; however in March 1913 those vehicles were also sold to Balfour Beatty's concern, for £350 each, and the tramway business ceased to be a concern of the Wemyss Estate. The electric tramway later ceased operating in January 1932 due to competition from motor buses; in fact Balfour Beatty themselves had become one of the largest bus operators in the district.

=== Death of Randolph Wemyss ===
For some time Wemyss had been suffering indifferent health, and on 17 July 1908 he died in London, at the age of 50. He was succeeded by his only son, Michael John Erskine Wemyss; he came of age eight months after his father's death.

=== Completion of Methil no 3 Dock ===
The prodigious no. 3 dock experienced many setbacks from the weather and sea action during construction. Robert McAlpine had 18 contractors' locomotives in use on the scheme.

On 22 January 1913 the new dock was declared open by the Countess of Dalkeith; it had cost £750,000, and it was actually opened to shipping on 24 March 1913. Even then there was continual difficulty with the operation of the dock gates, probably due to mining subsidence under their supports. Attempts to rectify this problem dragged on, and the onset of World War I in 1914 overtook events, as the export coal trade collapsed during hostilities. In 1915 it was stated to be necessary to close the dock temporarily to rectify the problem with the gates, but the NBR directed instead that the closure should be semi-permanent, as the available business could now easily be handled at the nos 1 and 2 docks. This closure took place on 18 March 1915; the whole construction had been abortive.

Reconstruction of the gates was attempted from June 1916 and was completed in June 1919.

=== After the First World War ===
Production from the WCC pits had doubled by 1920, but the export markets formerly served had much diminished. Industrial unrest, government controls of home sale prices, and other social factors made the profitability of the pits greatly reduced.

The railway was still in intensive activity, although not all the pits continued in use; the Hugo pit closed at this time; Isabella (renamed Cameron) closed on 17 March 1925, and Leven no. 4 (Klondyke) closed on 24 January 1925.

In 1923 the London and North Eastern Railway was formed from the North British Railway and other constituents (under the Railways Act 1921).

In 1926 worker dissatisfaction with wages and hours led to the General Strike; in fact the Fife miners struck on 1 May 1926, just before the nationwide stoppage. The strike ceased in November but irreparable damage had been done to some underground machinery by water ingress, and the Earlseat colliery never reopened productively. The Earlseat workers' train never resumed after this.

The state of the industry remained very difficult for some years, and in 1930 government regulation was introduced which removed many freedoms of the company; an 85% quota was imposed (that is, the company was required to reduce output by 15%).

Some of the pits were closed in this period, partly to meet the quota, and although the railway branches continued in use to move colliery waste, some closures took place. The line from Cameron Bridge to Plunks was closed in 1936.

=== The Second World War and afterwards ===
World War II started in 1939, and once again the pattern of coal output changed; export was almost completely stopped as London power stations required a considerable supply from the Fife coalfields.

Open cast extraction was started west of Earlseat and the Ministry of Fuel and Power arranged an extension there in 1944 to serve it.

After the end of the war government control was continued, and the collieries were nationalised from 1 January 1947. The railways immediately serving pits were allocated to those pits, but the main line and the rolling stock remained for the time being with the Wemyss Estate Railway, renamed the Wemyss Private Railway. The dispute over the valuation of the colliery siding assets dragged on until 1955: the WCC received a little under £2 million for them.

=== The Michael Colliery disaster ===
In the meantime the divided responsibility between the new National Coal Board (NCB), operating the collieries and the colliery sidings, the Wemyss Private Railway, and British Railways, led to lack of co-ordination and some railway safety shortcomings. The NCB also engaged in road haulage of pit output in some cases, and already some of the marginal sections of route closed. The mineral output of the area declined in the 1950s, and the decline of the least productive pits accelerated. Production was to be concentrated on the Michael Colliery, and the next largest producer, the Wellesley, was closed down on 22 July 1967.

On 9 September 1967 there was a spontaneous underground explosion at the Michael; nine workers died and production was halted instantly, and permanently. Only the Lochhead pit remained active, together with the coal washer, and the railway requirements were minimal. Lochhead closed on 27 March 1970, and the only residual traffic was from external collieries to the washer. This could not continue and the last day of WPR operation was on 26 June 1970.

== Locomotives ==
The first long section of railway was the Wemyss and Buckhaven Railway; this and several short branches built early on were worked by the North British Railway with that company's locomotives.

When the extension railway from Buckhaven to Methil and Leven was made, it was operated by the Wemyss Estate, and a four-wheel saddle tank locomotive was procured in 1884 from Barclays & Co of kilmarnock; it was named Lady Lilian. In 1887 a second similar engine was obtained from Grant, Ritchie and Company, and named Jubilee. When the Leven dock and railway were sold to the North British Railway, the locomotives were transferred also.

The Bowman company also operated pug engines for their own purposes, with some running on the Wemyss Estate line; a four-wheel saddle tank was obtained form Andrew Barclay in 1870, and a second was ordered in 1879. From 1884 to 1887 a second hand engine originally manufactured by Andrew Barclay in 1880 was in use on the Methil Dock construction, and in October 1887 it was purchased by Bowman. In 1890 and 1892 two more engines followed, from Andrew Barclay, and in 1892 an engine was also obtained from McCulloch, Sons and Kennedy of Kilmarnock. In 1903 the final engine was purchased form Gibb and Hogg of Airdrie.

Five of these locomotives passed to the Wemyss Estate Railway when Bowman's lease terminated in 1905.

When the Wemyss Coal Company was formed, the first locomotive it obtained was a powerful six-wheel saddle tank, intended for the steeply graded zigzag to the Michael colliery. It was named Lady Lilian and arrived in 1896. When Lady Lilian divorced Wemyss, the locomotive was designated No 1. instead.

WCC nos 2, 3 and 5 were four wheel saddle tanks built by Andrew Barclay and Sons in 1902 and 1903.

In 1903 a six-wheel saddle tank was ordered from Dübs and Company in July 1903. The order was fulfilled by the North British Locomotive Company which acquired Dübs shortly afterwards. It was delivered in April 1904 and became WCC no 4. A further six wheel saddle tank was obtained from Gibbs and Hogg, ordered in August 1904; it was second hand and was scrapped in 1907 after an accident; it was WCC no 6.

Locomotive no 7 was ordered in August 1904 and delivered the next month from the North British Locomotive Company, and no 8 was ordered form Hudswell Clarke and Co, and it was delivered in October 1905. No 9, also from Hudswell Clarke, was a six-wheeled side tank locomotive, otherwise similar to no 8.

No 14 was similar to no 9 and was obtained from Hudswell Clarke in 1912. (The intermediate numbers were taken up by the inherited Bowman locomotives.)

No 15 was obtained in May 1914 from R and W Hawthorn; it was another six wheeled side tank engine.

In June 1920 the locomotive fleet was run down due to the shortages of the War, and a second hand engine was obtained, becoming no 6 (replacing an earlier no 6). It had been built for the Great Northern Railway in 1875 and was a six-wheel saddle tank.

Increasing loadings and the ageing of the original locomotive fleet led to the purchase of a powerful six wheel side tank engine with the extraordinary tractive effort of 22,403 lb. It became WCC no 16 and was delivered from Andrew Barclay in July 1934. Two similar engines, nos 17 and 18 followed in 1935 and 1938, and nos 19 and 20 followed in 1939.

The final locomotive was no 21, a Hunslet Austerity 0-6-0ST type that had been built for the Ministry of Supply by Robert Stephenson and Hawthorn in 1943. It never carried the number 21.

After transfer of the colliery assets to the National Coal Board, the Wemyss Private Railway obtained a former Caledonian Railway 782 Class six wheel side tank locomotive built in 1899, formerly in British Railways service. It arrived in 1954 but was in poor condition. It was given the number 21, and was scrapped in 1959.

In 1958 a further Austerity locomotive was obtained second hand and given the number 15, followed by another Austerity, no 14, in 1961, and in 1964 a further example came to the line, numbered 16 replacing the earlier no 16, and another, no 13, in 1967.
