= Buckhaven High School =

Coordinates: 56.183°N 3.038°W

- Buckhaven, Fife; Scotland

Information
- Type: Secondary
- Motto: Perseverando (Persevere)
- Established: 1860s
- Closed: June 2016
- Rector: Grant Whytock (Final)
- Enrollment: 1,226
- Houses: Balgonie; Macduff; Lundin; Wemyss

Buckhaven High School was a six-year co-educational non-denominational comprehensive school in Buckhaven, Fife, Scotland. Originally, Buckhaven was Levenmouth's high school for pupils who passed their Eleven-plus examination, but later served all pupils from its catchment areas. The school's motto was Perseverando (Persevere).

The school's origins dated back to the 1860s and for many years it occupied a site in College Street, Buckhaven. The most recent building was in use from 1957 until 2016, and in 1976 an extension was completed. The catchments for the school were Buckhaven Primary, Methilhill Primary, East Wemyss Primary, Coaltown of Wemyss Primary, Parkhill Primary, Kirkton of Largo Primary and Kennoway Primary. They also received pupils from outwith the catchments who submitted placing requests.

== Merger ==
In June 2012 Fife Council proposed that the school should merge with neighbouring Kirkland High School and Community College to create Levenmouth Academy. The plans were approved in April 2014 and the new school opened to pupils on 17 August 2016.

== Notable former pupils ==
- Stuart Baxter - football manager
- Ruth Davidson - politician
- Alex Eadie - politician
- William Gear - artist
- David Mach - sculptor
- Henry McLeish - politician
- Emma Mukandi - footballer
- Clive Russell - actor
- Safyaan Sharif - cricketer
- John Wallace - trumpeter and composer
- Joseph Westwood - politician; Secretary of State for Scotland from 1945 to 1947.
