= Levenmouth Academy =

- The School Badge of Levenmouth Academy

Location
- Methilhaven Road; Buckhaven, Methil, KY8 1HL; Scotland

Information
- Type: Secondary
- Motto: Believe to Achieve
- Established: 17 August 2016 (pupils); 10 March 2017 (official)
- Local authority: Fife Council
- Headteacher: Ruth McFarlane
- Staff: c. 200
- Gender: Coeducational
- Age: 11 to 18
- Enrolment: 1800+
- Houses: Cotlands; Kingslaw; Letham; Sandwell
- Colours: Black, Purple and Gold
- Website: http://www.levenmouthacademy.org.uk

Levenmouth Academy is a six-year co-educational, non-denominational comprehensive school in Buckhaven, Scotland that serves the population in the Levenmouth area. In June 2012, Fife Council proposed that the neighbouring Kirkland and Buckhaven schools should close and their catchments would merge to create Levenmouth Academy. The plans were approved in April 2014, and the Academy opened to pupils on 17 August 2016. The school was opened officially on 10 March 2017 by then Deputy First Minister of Scotland John Swinney. The headteacher is Ruth McFarlane, who replaced Ronnie Ross in 2023.

== History ==
In June 2012, Fife Council made proposals that the existing Kirkland High School and Community College and Buckhaven High School would merge to create one new school. The proposals were prompted by the age of the respective buildings and facilities, and the grant for a new school from the Scottish Government. After a consultation with members of the public, families, and pupils of both the respective schools and their catchment primary schools, the plans for a new school were approved in April 2014.

The school is built on the former playing fields of Buckhaven High School. The Dutch construction firm BAM was awarded the building contract.

A competition was held by Fife Council to determine the name of the new school. Both pupils and members of the public were given the chance to enter a suggestion on the Fife Council website, and all of the suggestions were compiled. A panel of judges looked at all of the suggestions, and made a shortlist of five names that only pupils could vote on. These were: "Levenmouth High School", "Bayview High School", "East Fife High School", "Methilhaven High School" and "Levenmouth Academy". The one that was most popular with pupils was "Levenmouth Academy".
