= Wemyss and Buckhaven Railway =

Former railway line in Scotland

The Wemyss and Buckhaven Railway was a railway company that built a line in Fife in Scotland, connecting Buckhaven with the main line railway network at Thornton, and linking with collieries.

It was financed privately by the Wemyss Estate and largely built on Wemyss Estate land, and it opened in 1881.

It was extended to harbours at Methil and Leven in 1884 to give collieries better access to export shipping; the extension line was called the Leven Extension Railway, and was also privately financed. A passenger service was operated between Thornton and Methil.

The line was sold to the North British Railway in 1889.

The railway served the rich mineral resources of the East Fife Coalfield, but that declined after 1930, and passenger carryings fell steeply at the same time. The line was closed to passenger traffic in 1955 and to all except a very limited goods and mineral traffic in 1965. It closed completely in 1980 and there is now no railway activity on the former line.

== History ==
=== First railways ===
As part of the frenzy of railway speculation culminating in 1845, the Edinburgh and Northern Railway was authorised by Edinburgh and Northern Railway Act 1845 (8 & 9 Vict. c. clviii) to build from Burntisland to Perth and Dundee, forming a through communication between Edinburgh and Dundee with ferry crossings of the Firth of Forth and the Firth of Tay. The company changed its name to the Edinburgh, Perth and Dundee Railway (EP&DR), and opened its main line in the years 1847 to 1848, running broadly south to north through Thornton.

Leven was an important manufacturing town and port at the time, and the independently promoted Leven Railway opened in 1854, joining the town with a junction with the EP&DR at Thornton. The Leven Railway did not connect to the harbour at Leven, and its objective was eventually to extend eastwards to serve the fishing communities on the Fife coast. In fact another independent company, the East of Fife Railway, extended from Leven to Kilconquhar; the two companies merged, forming the Leven and East of Fife Railway and extending to Anstruther.

=== The Wemyss Estate ===
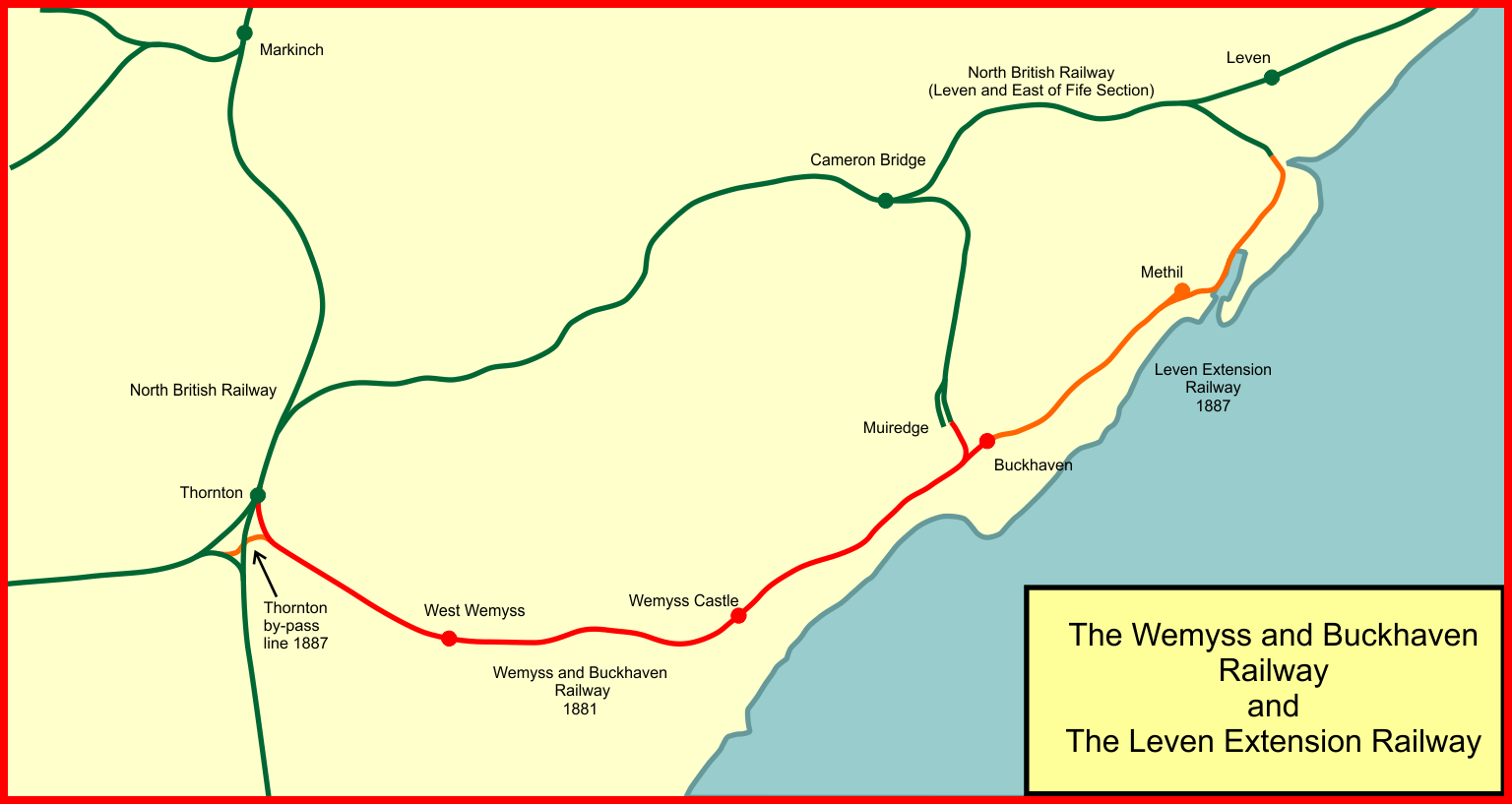
System map of the Wemyss and Buckhaven Railway

Extensive lands in East Fife were in the ownership of the Wemyss family, and in 1854 James Hay Erskine Wemyss succeeded to the lairdship. Coal had long been extracted on the Wemyss Estate by tenants, and James Wemyss wished to encourage the activity. It was held back by difficult transport conditions; the priority of the Leven Railway and its extensions was not to connect with the pits, and the coastwise and export shipping routes were constrained by the limited harbour facilities on the coast. It was not until 1868 that the Leven and East of Fife Railway constructed a branch line to Muiredge, connecting a pit there, and even so there was no railway route to a useful harbour in East Fife, and much of the export traffic went to Burntisland; this was a long and expensive rail transit. The North British Railway (NBR) took over the EP&DR in 1862 and effectively controlled railway transit in the area.

=== The Wemyss and Buckhaven Railway ===
Although some improvements were made to local harbours, the intransigent attitude of the North British Railway, and its monopoly freedom to set haulage rates, was resented by the coalmaster tenants of the Wemyss Estate. In addition the exploitation of the coal deposits in the East Fife coalfield led to the opening of a considerable number of new pits in this period, and the North British Railway was unwilling to connect them to the railway network.

In May 1874 a committee of coalmasters discussed building their own line to the developing Methil Dock, a little west of Leven. Nothing came of this discussion at first, but in 1878 a definite scheme was produced to connect Buckhaven with Thornton. Thornton was chosen as the junction because of the convenience of bringing coal from Dunfermline, as the West Fife coalfield also required an outlet to an alternative harbour.

Matters progressed and on 17 October 1879 a certificate for the construction of the railway was issued by the Board of Trade; an act of Parliament was not required because no compulsory land acquisition was needed and there were no objections to the scheme. Nor was a new joint stock company to be established, as the Wemyss Estate was to finance the construction. This arrangement had been enabled by the Railways Construction Facilities Act 1864 (27 & 28 Vict. c. 121).

The line was a little over four miles long; by the end of 1880 a demonstration goods train was run, but the line was not properly finished, and the Board of Trade inspection took place on 30 July 1881, by Major General Hutchinson. With some qualifications, the line was passed as fit for passenger operation, and it opened formally on 1 August 1881. It was worked by the North British Railway for 40% of gross revenue. There were intermediate stations at West Wemyss (at the present-day Standing Stane Road) and Wemyys Castle, close to the town of East Wemyss. It had private accommodation for Wemyss and his family.

A short branch was made in 1881 to join the NBR Muiredge branch, and a connection from the new Rosie pit, which ran as a high level siding parallel to, and above, the W&B line.

=== Extending to Methil ===
James Wemyss died in 1864, and his eldest son Randolph Gordon Erskine Wemyss (1858 - 1908) inherited the lairdship at the age of six. It was in trust until his majority; the Trustees managed the affairs of the Estate, led by his Mother. Randolph Wemyss was an exceptionally dynamic manager of the affairs of the Wemyss Estate, and he saw that the existing dock accommodation in the area was inadequate. Leven Harbour had been improved and a short railway branch from the Leven Railway had been formed, but the harbour suffered from serious silting, limiting the size of shipping that could be handled.

The North British Railway had developed Burntisland as its main harbour in Fife, and much of the rail-connected coal traffic went there; this was a considerable mileage, and income to the NBR, and local coalmasters resented the expense when there were several small harbours locally that were not used.

Methil harbour was available, but the dock accommodation there was very limited, being only capable of handling ships up to 150 tons. As the rate of coal extraction increased, the lack of useful local harbour facilities became of increasing significance, and in 1879 Wemyss and his tenant coalmasters agreed on the construction of a proper dock at Methil. To avoid opposition from the Leven Harbour Company, Wemyss approached them to purchase their business. They were receptive, as all their initial capital had been expended and further construction was needed, which they were unable to fund. Struggling with heavy indebtedness, the Company sold out to the Wemyss Estate (Randolph Wemyss, his tenant colliers and certain other business interests) in 1883 for £12,000. By this purchase the Wemyss Estate acquired the branch railway to Leven Harbour.

In proposing to develop Methil harbour and extend the Buckhaven line to Methil and to Leven Harbour, Wemyss foresaw strong opposition from the North British Railway, who would lose mileage by it. Wemyss forged an agreement with them, ratified on 21 April 1883 by agreeing to the Burntisland carriage rates applying to coal traffic from outside the immediate area to Methil and Leven. Wemyss also agreed not to allow competing railways access to the area over his lands; the North British anticipated an incursion by the rival Caledonian Railway and this may have been significant in securing their consent to Wemyss' line.

The line to extend the Buckhaven line to Leven Harbour, which became known as the Leven Connection Railway, two miles long from Buckhaven to Leven Dock, was formally opened to goods and mineral traffic on 17 September 1884. Parliamentary authorisation was not required. The line was inspected by Major General Hutchinson on 3 March 1887 and opened to passenger traffic on 5 May 1887, operating as an extension of the Wemyss and Buckhaven line; passenger trains ran between Thornton, Buckhaven and Methil; only mineral traffic continued to Leven Harbour, but the new, well-equipped Methil Dock opened on 5 May 1887 also. The cost of the dock and railway extension had been £227,000.

In eight months of 1887 Methil shipped 220,000 tons, rising to 409,000 in the full year 1888; Burntisland throughput fell substantially in the same period.

=== Thornton avoiding line ===
The mineral traffic built up rapidly, and included heavy flows from Dunfermline. The routing for those trains involved a reversal at Thornton, on the NBR main line, and this caused significant delay; a direct line passing under the main line was built in 1886 - 1887; it had steep gradients, falling from the Dunfermline direction at 1 in 52 and rising again at 1 in 74. Wemyss contributed £1,000 to the cost of construction. It was doubled some time after 1901.

=== Transfer to the North British Railway ===
Wemyss did not foresee retaining long term operation of the harbour at Methil, and he conducted negotiations with the North British Railway; the outcome was that the NBR purchased the harbour from it for £225,000, and with it they took the Wemyss and Buckhaven Railway, which became a branch of the NBR. The transfer took place on 1 February 1889, (Note: FRPS say 11 January 1889.) ratified by the North British Railway Act 1889 (52 & 53 Vict. c. xc) of 26 July 1889 (Note: Awdry and Carter; Ross, naming the act, incorrectly says 12 June 1889.) and included the Methil extension.

Wemyss went on to construct several connecting lines to pits not otherwise served by railways, and in time a substantial network, ultimately referred to as the Wemyss Private Railway was developed. The relationship between that network and the North British Railway was not always entirely amicable.

=== The twentieth century ===
In 1923 the North British Railway was a constituent of the new London and North Eastern Railway (LNER) created as part of the "grouping" of the railways of Great Britain, following the Railways Act 1921.

The LNER found that passenger carryings were falling as road transport improved locally, and they introduced the Sentinel railcars for passenger trains on the line. A vehicle named Banks of Don was provided from January 1931. Its performance was stated to be "indifferent" and the sharp 1 in 50 gradient from Methil to Buckhaven led to problems with slipping, especially on frosty mornings. Other Sentinel cars substituted from time to time. The passenger service ran to and from Thornton, where onward passengers had to change.

Football excursions on the line were of special significance in this period, and the success of East Fife F.C., based in Methil, led to heavy inward supporters' traffic in addition to the outward traffic to away matches. East Fife were prominent from 1927 to 1931 and again at the end of the 1930s.

Nationalisation of the railways took place from 1 January 1948, and the line was now part of British Railways. The passenger service had lost custom substantially, and further economies were put in hand, including the closure of the little-used West Wemyss station in 1949. The route was inconvenient, and the change of train at Thornton was also a negative factor. The last passenger train ran on 9 January 1955, carrying 20 passengers. Football special trains continued to run while the line remained in use for goods trains, although these were much reduced in number too.

From 2 December 1963 the line between Thornton and West Wemyss was closed to all traffic, and from 28 December 1964 goods traffic was withdrawn from Wemyss Castle and Buckhaven stations. From 16 December 1965 the section from West Wemyss to Lochhead Colliery closed, and from 15 December 1966 the entire line closed completely, except for the Methil station area, which was a goods depot served from Kirkland Yard via the docks. That too closed on 31 May 1980, but reopened as a private siding for a coal merchant from 1 October 1980, closing finally on 31 May 1985.

== Topography ==
The line from Thornton to Buckhaven opened on 1 August 1881, and closed to passengers on 10 January 1955. Locations on the line were:

- Thornton; junction station on Edinburgh, Perth and Dundee Railway main line; indicated as Thornton Junction from 1850 in Bradshaw;
- West Wemyss; closed 1 January 1917; re-opened 2 June 1919; closed 7 November 1949;
- Wemyss Castle;
- Buckhaven.

Leven Extension Railway: the line opened on 17 September 1884 for goods and mineral trains, and to passengers between Buckhaven and Methil on 5 May 1887 and closed to passengers on 10 January 1955.

- Buckhaven (above);
- Methil;
- Leven; not a station; junction with North British Railway.
