= Rheinisches Braunkohlerevier =

Mining area in Germany

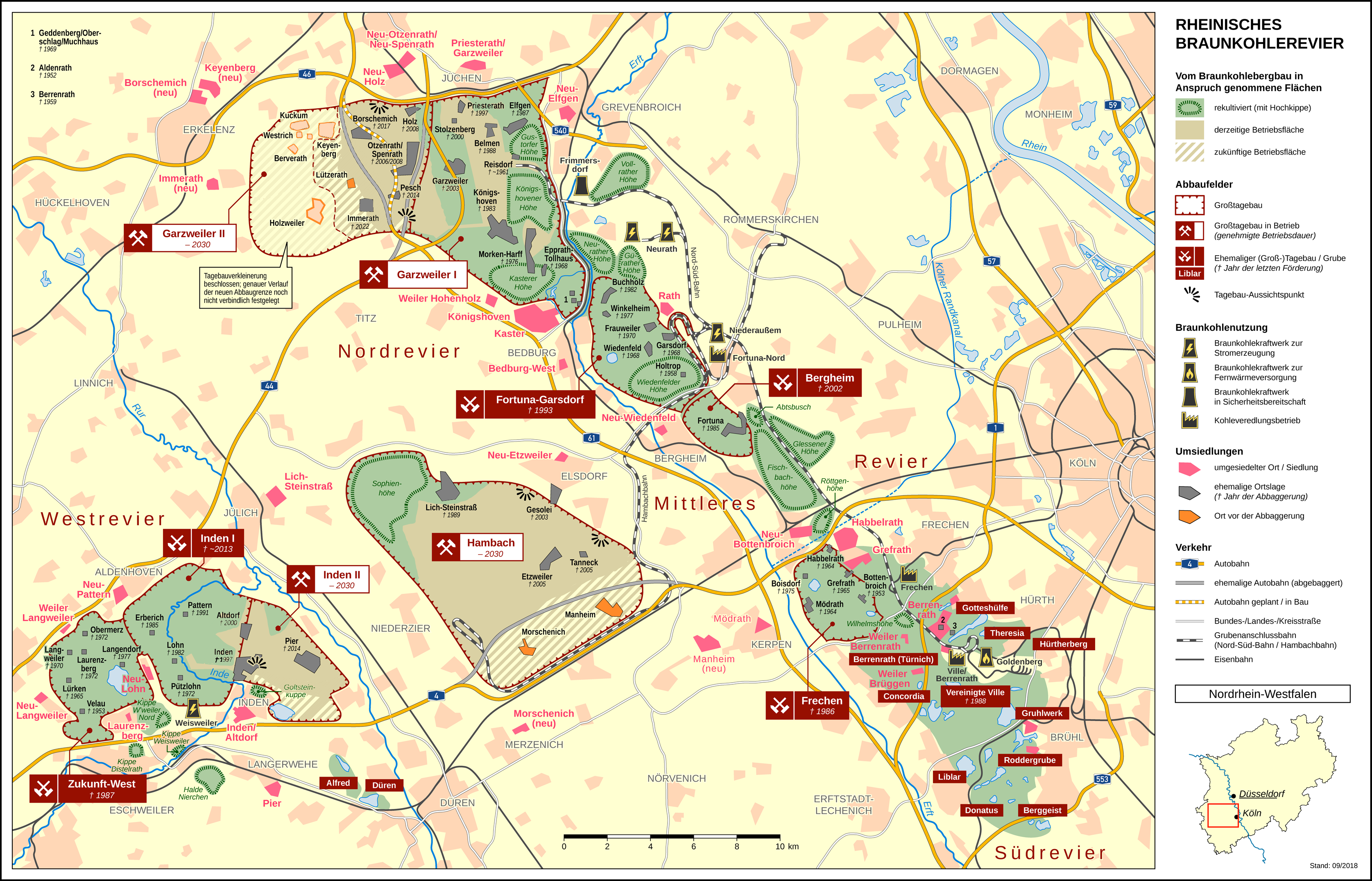
Rhenish lignite mining region (as of September 2018) Rheinisches Braunkohlerevier

The Rheinisches Braunkohlerevier, often called the Rhenish mining area, is a lignite mining area or district in the Cologne Bay, on the northwestern edge of the Rhenish Slate Mountains. The mining of lignite using the open pit method has had a significant impact on the landscape here and led to the formation of several important industrial sites. The area includes the Zülpicher and Jülicher Börde, the Erft lowlands and the Ville, making it the largest lignite mining area in Europe. To a lesser extent clay, silica sand and loess are mined here. The area is the only active lignite mining area in what was West Germany during German partition (all other active lignite mines in Germany are in the former east) and contains the mines with the largest surface area, greatest depth (both absolute and relative to Normalhöhennull), and biggest annual output of coal.

Today, the industrial use of the coalfield with the complete value chain from coal mining to power generation is carried out exclusively by the RWE Group (via its subsidiary RWE Power). According to current planning, mining in the Rhenish lignite mining area is secured until 2030. Forecasts about future developments are difficult, as a central pillar of the German energy turnaround is a coal phase-out.

== Boundaries and division ==
=== Southern District ===
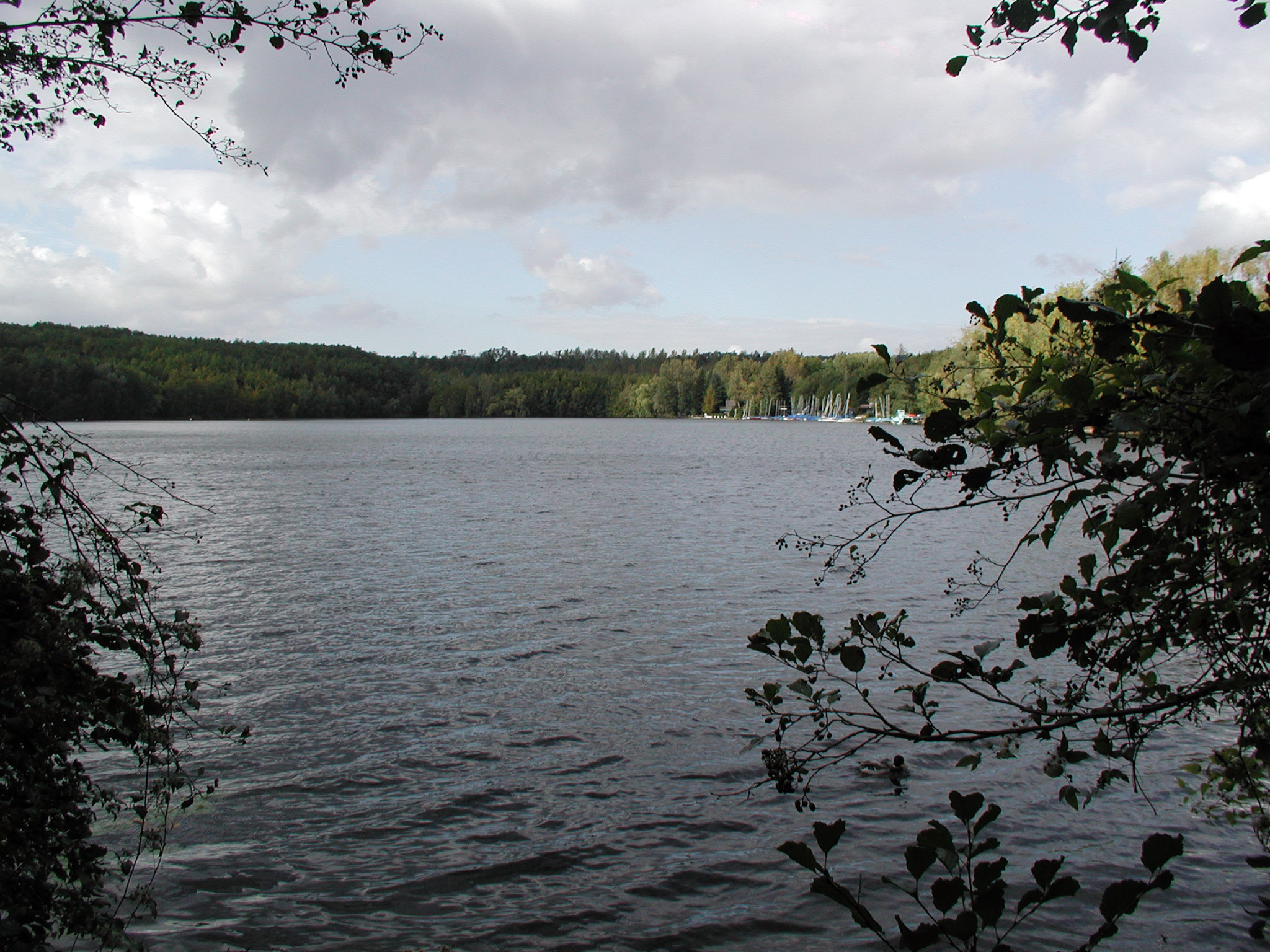
Heider mountain lake (Heider Bergsee) in the restored village

The southern district around Brühl begins south of Brühl in the Ville, there north of a line Brühl-Eckdorf/ Erftstadt-Bliesheim. The southern district extends approximately as far as the course of the Luxemburger Straße B 265 near Hürth and Liblar and includes the former Gewerkschaft Hürtherberg mine and the present Hürtherberg recreational area. On the south side, it encloses the concessions of Carl Brendgen and his companies around Kierdorf. This area of small-scale mines had already been exhausted and recultivated by the mid-1960s. The open pits have given way to a forested recreational area with a large number of small and medium-sized lakes.

=== Middle district ===
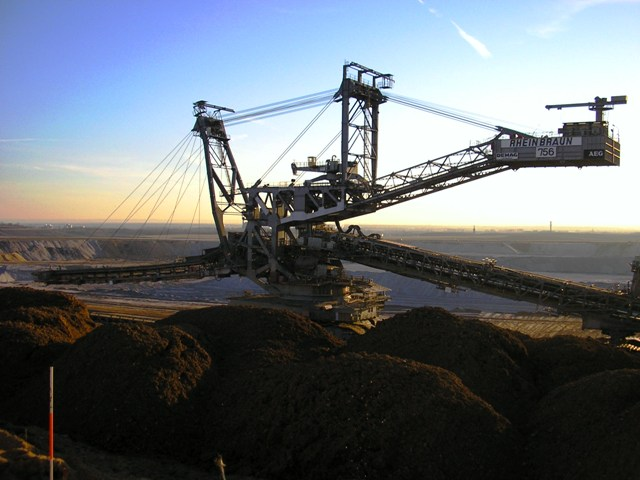
Stacker during backfilling and recultivation in the Bergheim opencast mine (2008)

The Middle Mining District covers the Villerücken area west of the Frechener Sprung (Frechen-Oberaußem-Niederaußem line) from the Luxemburger Strasse in the south to the Bergheim-Oberaußem line in the north. It is now largely decarbonized and recultivated, but the lignite industry with large power plants and downstream industries still characterizes the landscape.

=== Northern District (Nordrevier) ===
The northern district adjoins the seam-free Kasterer Horst and the Erft bend to the east and extends with the Garzweiler I and II opencast mines as far as Jüchen and Erkelenz, with the lignite seams extending to even greater depths below the Niers and Schwalm rivers. It also includes parts of the Erftscholle with the Hambach deep open pit mine near Jülich. Here, overburden and coal are extracted using large equipment such as bucket wheel excavators, and the pits are then backfilled using large-scale conveyor systems and spreaders. The coal is transported to the plants in the south by a dedicated rail network (north-south railroad (Garzweiler) and Hambach railroad). The Sophienhöhe spoil heap (290 m. above sea level) towers over the Jülicher Börde, visible from afar.

=== Western district (Westrevier) ===
The western coalfield between Düren, Weisweiler, Eschweiler, Alsdorf, Aldenhoven and Jülich with the former Zukunft open pit mine, BIAG Zukunft and the Inden open pit mine uses seams of the Rurscholle to supply the Weisweiler power plant.

Mining the less thick lignite seams adjacent to this area is not economically viable at present. This is all the more true as it would involve resettlement measures at the same time.

Several industrial areas around the mining area have developed based on lignite, eg the Wesseling oil refinery which developed from a coal liquefaction plant founded in 1939, or the RWE transformer and electrical substation in Brauweiler. These are usually classed as being within the district.

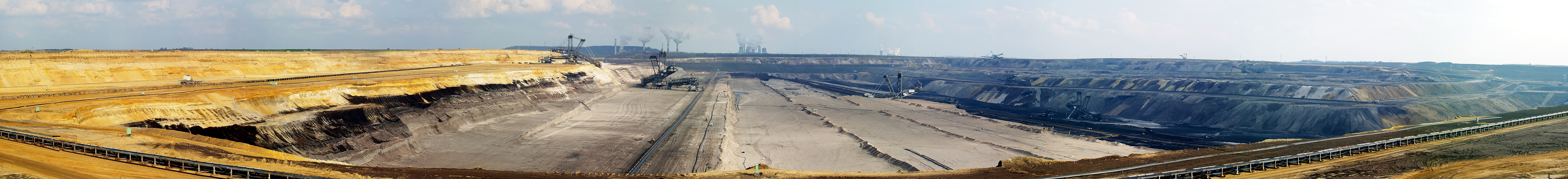
Panoramic photo of Garzweiler open cast mine with various excavators in operation. In the background are the power stations of Grevenbroich-Frimmersdorf (left), Neurath (centre) and Niederaußem (right).

=== Border areas ===
In addition to the above-mentioned main areas of the Rhenish mining district, there were also deposits of lignite on the eastern and southern edges of the Cologne Bay, which were also mined in some smaller pits in places until the 20th century. Geologically, these deposits are to be counted among the Rhenish lignite; organizationally and culturally, however, the lignite mines located in this area belong to the mining districts of the adjacent mountains, which are characterized by other mineral resources.

These include:

- Occurrences on the western edge of the Bergisches Land near Bergisch
- Gladbach and on the northern edge of the Siebengebirge near Troisdorf, Siegburg and Bonn, belong to the ore districts there (see Bensberg ore district). Occurrences on the northern edge of the Eifel near Euskirchen and Zülpich (today Lake Neffel and Lake Zülpich). Deposits in the Dutch and Belgian part of Limburg, between Heerlen and Genk, belong to the Limburg coal district Vorkommen am Westrand of Bergischen Landes at Bergisch Gladbach and at Nordrand des Siebengebirges at Troisdorf, Siegburg and Bonn, are among the Erzrevieren (see Bensberger Erzrevier)
- Occurrences at the northern edge of Eifel at Euskirchen and Zülpich (today Neffelsee and Zülpicher See)
- Occurrences in Limburg (Netherlands) and Limburg (Belgium), between Heerlen and Genk, belong to Limburger Steinkohlerevier.

== Geology ==
During the Tertiary period, subsidence movements began in the Lower Rhine Bay 30 million years ago. A shallow sedimentation basin was formed for the original rivers Rhine, Rur, Erft, Sieg and Meuse. This basin gradually subsided and formed relay fractures, while the neighboring Rhenish Slate Mountains were uplifted. In several phases the primeval North Sea advanced into this area. Bogs, whose vegetation could not be decomposed in the water, formed above the clay layers deposited in depressions. The resulting low thickness peats were covered with gravels, sands and clays by further alternations of marine transgressions and regressions. Between 20 and 23 million years ago, at the beginning of the Miocene, climatic conditions favored mire vegetation and the formation of peat. Gravel layers were deposited on the peat layers, sealing them airtight, and their pressure intensified the process of coalification: the peat gradually became lignite. In the main seam group of the Ville, lignites of up to 70 meters thickness can be found today. In the last phase of the Miocene, the seams of the Inden strata formed above the Rurscholle in the western district. In the Pliocene, no seams formed, instead the area went into increased tectonic unrest. The basin broke along two main fault lines (Rurrand and Erft line) into three floes, which in turn formed smaller terrain jumps and relay fractures. These northward-roofing floes subsided to varying degrees, tilting eastward. The lignite layers of the Erftscholle are covered with sediments of 100 (Rurrand) to 400 meters (Erftsprung), in northern direction partly even more. The seams strike the surface of the Villehorst in the southern district near Brühl or were cut in the impact slope by the Tertiary Rhine or the streams of the foothills.

== History of the lignite industry ==
=== First uses (17th to 19th centuries) ===
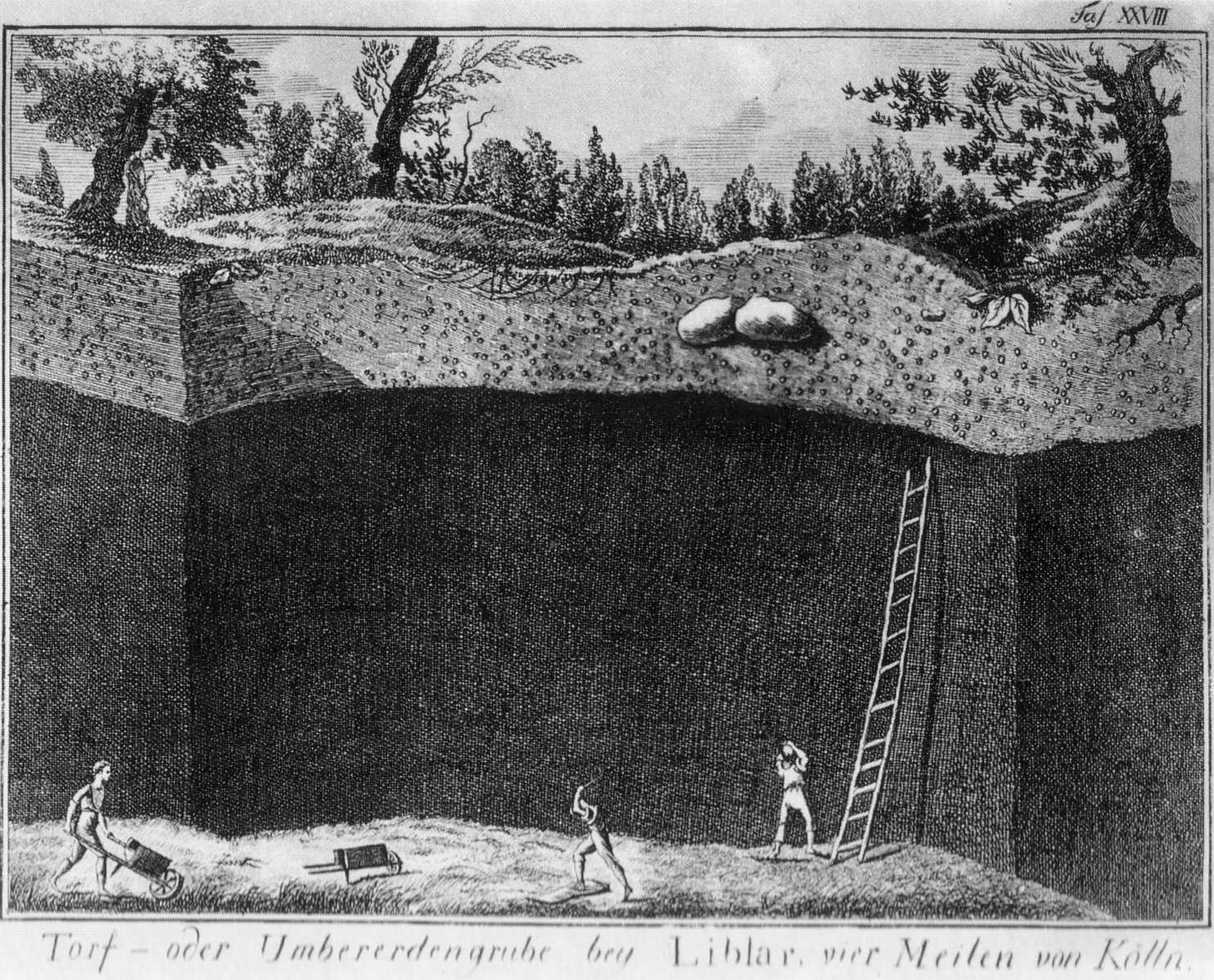
Peat and umber pit near Liblar c. 1796

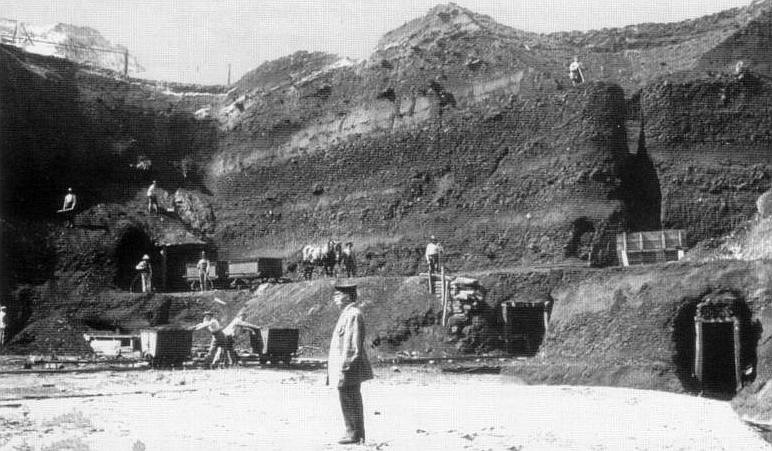
Lignite mining in Brühl c. 1880

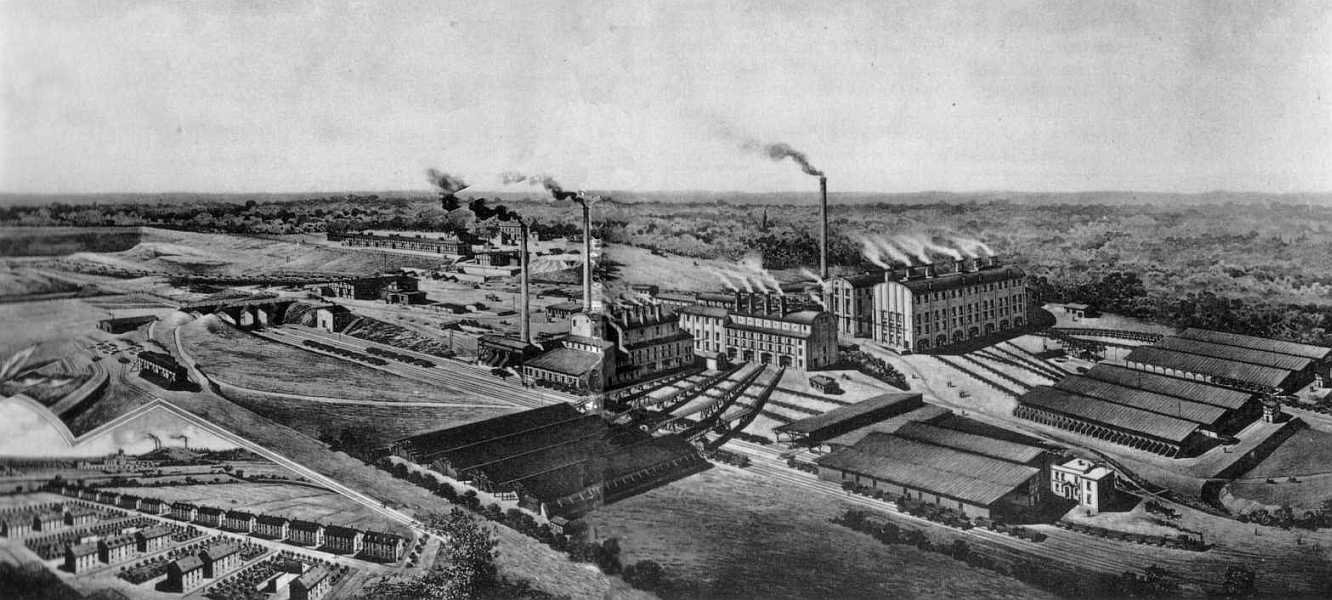
Briquette factories of the Donatus trade union near Liblar c. 1897

Initially, lignite was only extracted as a basic material for the color production of the Cologne umber and for the leaching of alum. It was not until the end of the 17th century that it was discovered that the wet, unusable layer, which was stored above the clay layer during clay extraction for the ceramics industry in the Brühl and Frechen area and had to be cleared away, was combustible after drying. The respective landlords then had this peat-like substance (turf) dug in small pits by small farmers and day laborers with hoes and spades. It was compressed in pots to Klütten (from Low German Kluit = lump) and dried in the air in summer. The Klütten had only a low calorific value. They were used locally or sold to poor people in the nearby town. Such pits still existed until the 1920s.

In the western coalfield, lignite was discovered in 1819 while digging wells in the village of Lucherberg near Inden. In 1826, the landowner Karl von Goldstein began mining a 7.5 meter thick seam.

=== Beginning of the lignite industry (1850-1905) ===
With industrialization and railroad construction (in 1859, the Dombrücke was the first railroad bridge in Cologne to connect the western Rhineland with the Ruhr region), sales declined due to competition from cheap hard coal, reaching a brief low in 1876.

At the beginning of the general upswing after the Franco-Prussian War of 1870–1871, entrepreneurs in Brühl in 1877 (Friedrich Eduard Behrens with the Roddergrube union) and 1878 (Brühl union) and in 1892 Hermann and his son Carl Gruhl with the Gruhlwerk made coal extraction competitive by means of steam-driven dewatering pumps and revolutionized the production of briquettes by means of mechanical presses. Such presses based on Exter's process had been developed in the Central German lignite mining district in 1872 and were now also used in Brühl. Further briquette factories were established in rapid succession. Supraregional railroad lines as well as the local railroads Köln-Frechen-Benzelrather Eisenbahn of 1893, Bergheimer Kreisbahn of 1897/1899 and Hürth-Kalscheuren-Hürth-Knapsack of 1901 connected towns in the Ville, opened up further coal fields or linked mines to the demand areas.

The first briquette factory in the West was built in 1888 by the Maria Theresia zu Herzogenrath trade union. In 1913, the lignite industry AG Zukunft was founded in the western coalfield as a merger of various small unions with the aim of building a lignite-fired power plant. In 1914, the Zukunft open pit mine and the first Weisweiler power plant went into operation.

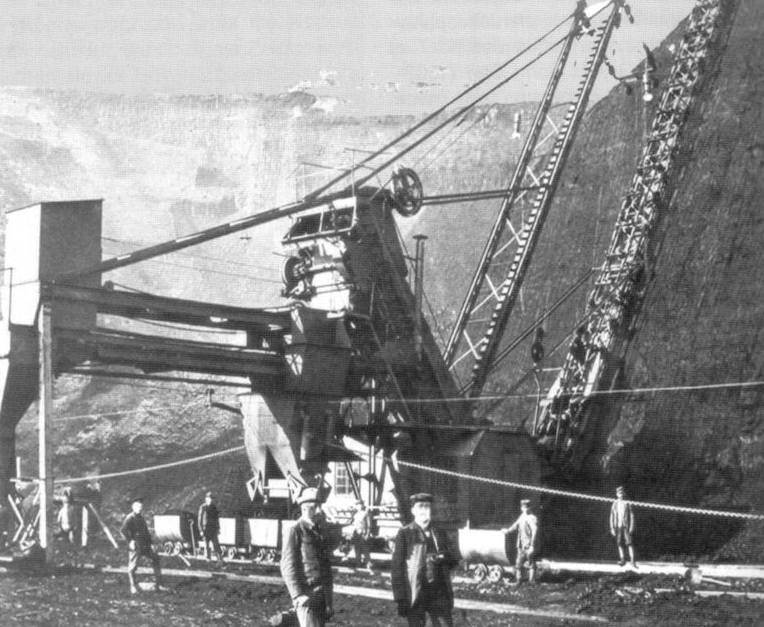
Der Eiserne Mann (The Iron Man) in the Gruhlwerk 1907

Mechanization made further progress: In 1895, the first overburden excavator, which had been built for the construction of the Kiel Canal, was used in the Donatus mine near Liblar. The first inclined dredger for coal mining was used at the Brühl Gruhlwerk in 1907 and was given the name "Iron Man". By 1909, there were already four coal excavators in the 29 mines, and in 1913 only three mines had no excavators. Production rose from five million tons in 1905 to 17.4 million tons in 1913, but sales were still difficult compared with traditional hard coal. The mines competed with each other. In 1899, 19 mines joined to form a sales syndicate to sell briquettes as a branded product under the name Union-Brikett with uniform standards.

In 1907, commercial mining began in the northern mining district between Neurath and Garzweiler with the opening up of the Rheingold field, initially still with picks and lorries. A year later, the first scraper excavator was used. Today, the mining fields are combined in the Garzweiler open pit mine.

=== Start of electricity generation from lignite (1892-1918) ===
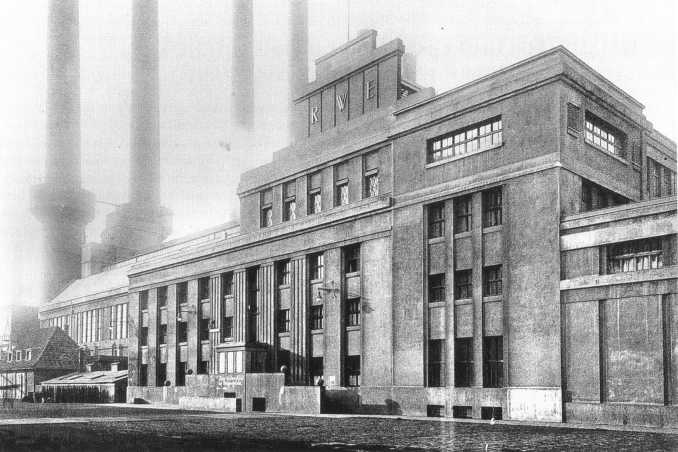
Kraftwerk Goldenberg (1914)

The first small power plant to supply the town of Frechen with electricity was built in 1892 at the Herbertskaul mine. The first power plant with a capacity of about one megawatt (MW) was built in 1899 in connection with the Brühl sugar factory at the Berggeist mine. The Berggeist power plant was taken over by Rheinisch-Westfälische Elektrizitätswerk (RWE), Essen, in 1906. This was the beginning of the now more than 100-year association between lignite and RWE. In 1910, the 8 MW Fortuna power plant was built in the northern coalfield to supply Cologne and Bergheim. Then, in 1912–1918, RWE built the Goldenberg power plant in Knapsack, the first large-scale power plant based on lignite, with a capacity of 90 MW in 1918 (500 MW in 1932). In addition, since about 1900, each briquette factory generated its own electricity, which - if not needed itself - it fed into the power grid (see also article on coal refining). The inexpensive energy attracted the first energy-intensive chemical plants, such as the calcium cyanamide plant in Knapsack in 1907, which initially also generated its own electricity.

=== The coalfield between the world wars ===
Until the beginning of the 20th century, lignite was of little importance for Germany's energy and fuel supply. It was mainly the higher-quality hard coal that was used. After the First World War, the German Empire had to cede numerous areas and lost around 40% of its best hard coal deposits. The remaining coalfields also had to pay considerable reparations. As a result, lignite became an indispensable energy factor in all branches of industry. Whereas before 1919 the share of lignite in electricity generation had played no role at all due to its low calorific value, poor transportability and lack of heating and transmission technology, the coal shortage associated with the territorial cessions and the autarky efforts in the Weimar Republic forced an increase to a share of almost 60% of energy production.

This led to a huge increase in output in all German lignite regions. On this basis, Germany became the world's largest producer and at the same time the largest consumer of lignite in the 1920s.. Until 1945, the statistical classification distinguished the Central German Mining District, the Eastern Elbe Mining District and the Rhenish Mining District as the largest lignite mining areas. Before the Second World War, the Central German coalfield supplied about two-fifths of all German lignite, and the East German and Rhenish coalfields each supplied about one-fourth..

Coal production in the Rhenish lignite mining area had already reached 17.4 million tons by 1918, returning to the level of 1913. At the beginning of the 1920s, due to efforts to achieve self-sufficiency and intensive mechanization, open pit mining had already become profitable with a ratio of overburden (= overburden) to lignite of 4:1. This enabled annual production to climb to 48.0 million tons by 1929. In the course of the world economic crisis, lignite production briefly fell to 39.2 million tons. Between 1933 and 1943, it rose steadily to 68.6 million tons. The focus of production shifted to the northern mining district. The first mines in the southern district closed as early as 1931 (Maria Glück) and 1933 (Roddergrube).

In 1920, Hugo Stinnes took over the shares of Roddergrube. This led to RWE's dominant position in lignite mining. In 1932, after the takeover of what was later to become Rheinbraun, the Group companies accounted for about 60% of the workforce totaling 12,404 workers and 70% of the 645 briquette presses in the Ville area.

The biggest increase in production was due to the increase in electricity generation. Whereas in 1914 the two power plants at the Ville site together produced 38 MW, in 1932 the Goldenberg plant produced 500 MW, Fortuna 174 MW and Frimmersdorf 90 MW. The briquette factories generated a further 11 MW of surplus energy.

The chemical industry developed rapidly. In 1927, Degussa's sodium, chlorine and chlorinated lime plant was built in Knapsack. The Martinswerk in Bergheim produced aluminum oxide and alumina hydrate.

==== The coalfield under the influence of the National Socialist autarky policy ====
After 1933, the National Socialist autarky efforts gave further impetus to mining. The rearmament of the Wehrmacht and the Second World War resulted in a very high demand for energy. From 1934 to 1942, briquette production in the mining district was increased from 9 million tons to a record 14.5 million tons per year. On the advice of Reich Economics Minister Hjalmar Schacht, coal liquefaction processes were promoted and Union Rheinischer Braunkohlen Kraftstoff AG was founded in Wesseling in 1937.

The coal deposits in the southern district ran out, so northern opencast mines were expanded or newly developed to meet the increased demand for coal. Coal mining and processing could only be maintained during the world war with the help of several tens of thousands of forced laborers and prisoners of war; many Germans employed in lignite mining were called up for military service.

==== Tiefbau-Schachtanlage Union 103 ====
During test drilling in 1927, seams were discovered at depths of over 200 meters northwest of Kerpen. With the state of the art at the time, open pit mining at this depth was not possible. In line with National Socialist efforts to achieve self-sufficiency, lignite was to be mined underground here on an experimental basis. The specially founded Rheinische Braunkohlentiefbaugesellschaft began sinking two shafts between Morschenich and Elsdorf in 1939.. A similar attempt by the Neu-Deutz trade union in Cologne lime around 1850 had failed because of the high groundwater levels. In Morschenich, the project initially succeeded: between 1941 and 1954, seams up to 70 meters thick were mined at a depth of almost 350 meters. But the experiment was abandoned as early as 1954: The geological conditions allowed mining only with extreme technical effort, which made the enterprise uneconomical. The four main tunnels and their side galleries with a total length of eleven kilometers were reinforced with 25,000 cubic meters of concrete and 8300 tons of steel, and the two access shafts were sealed. In 2014, the Hambach deep open pit mine reached these adits.

=== The coalfield since 1945 ===
==== Mergers and concentration ====
In 1960, RWE also took over the BIAG of the western coalfield. Until German reunification, the Rhenish mining area was thus the most important lignite region in the Federal Republic of Germany. However, annual lignite production in eastern Germany was higher. Other lignite mining areas in western Germany included the Braunschweig coal mines in Helmstedt and the Hirschberg mines near Kassel and Wackersdorf in the Upper Palatinate. In eastern Germany, lignite mining and power generation in the Lusatian and Central German lignite mining areas are now carried out by LEAG and Mibrag respectively following extensive restructuring.

==== Coal refining and power generation ====
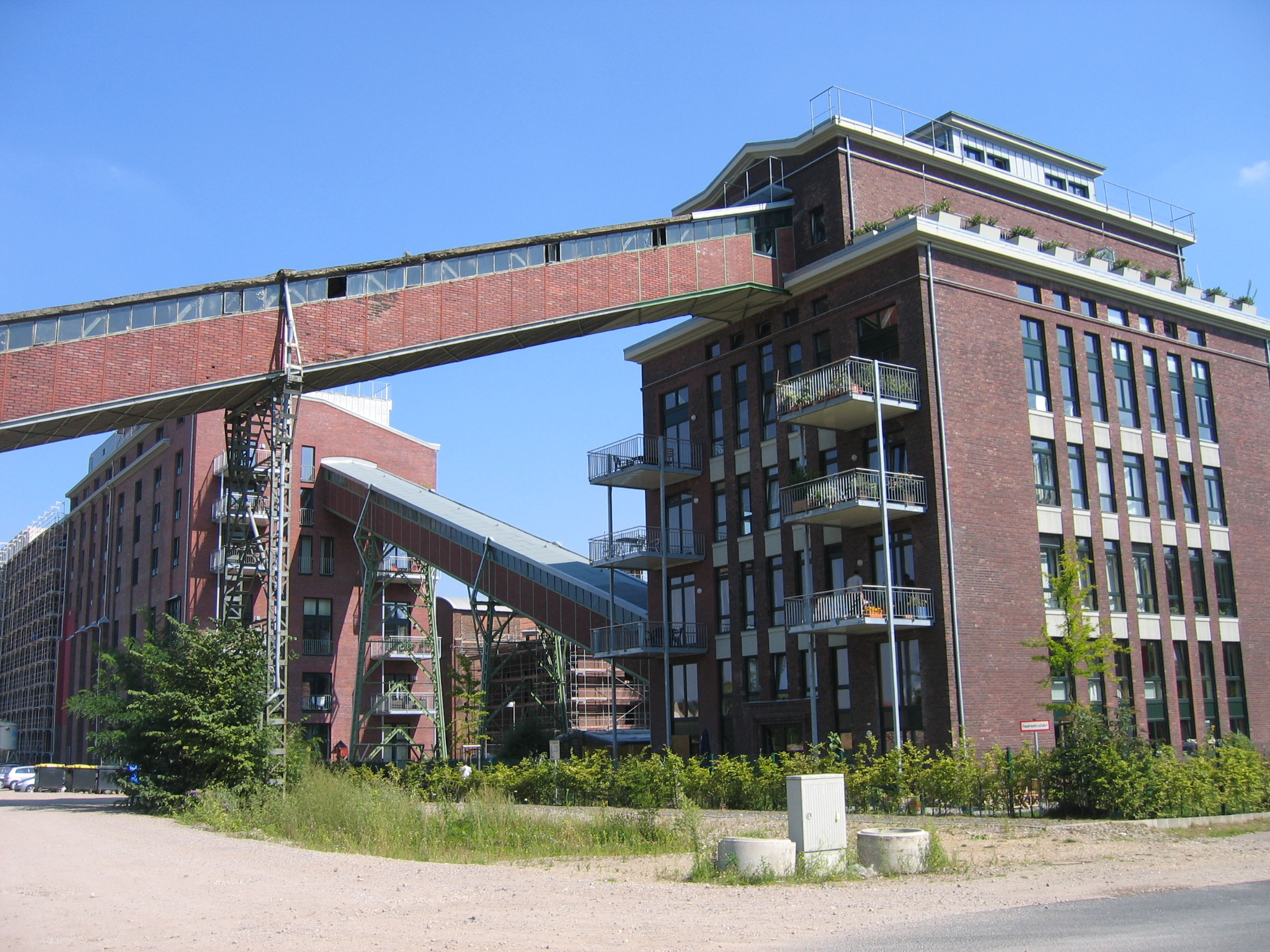
Carl briquette factory in Frechen converted into a residential complex

The peak of briquette production was in the 1950s. At that time, more than 40 million tons of raw lignite were pressed into briquettes each year. The Carl briquette factory in Frechen alone produced around 40 million tons of briquettes from 1907 until its closure in 1995.s. In contrast, coal use at the three coal refining plants still in operation today is low. With a capacity of 17 million tons of raw coal per year, only 10.6 million tons are currently used on average. Mainly pulverized coal is produced here for use in large industrial firing plants (e.g. cement works, paper mills, sugar refineries). The Fortuna-Nord coal refining plant also produces lignite coke. Lignite dust and coke production capacities are being expanded. Due to stable lignite prices and simultaneously rising oil prices, the use of lignite in industry has been economically very interesting since 2003.

The Frechen coal refining plant is the only one still producing about half domestic and half industrial briquettes with its 1.7 million t dry coal production. Nevertheless, briquette presses are still kept at the other two plants. The decline in private briquette consumption continues today. In reunified Berlin, for example, there were still almost half a million homes with stove heating in 1990; in 2002, there were still 60,000. Whereas 1.8 million tons of lignite briquettes were burned there in 1991, there were only about 25,000 in 2004. In turn, the share of lignite in electricity production in the coalfield continued to rise. Whereas in 1960 it was 45 percent, by 1991 85 percent of lignite was used to generate electricity.

==== Power plants ====
The power plants became larger and more powerful: The Goldenberg power plant was expanded from 500 MW to 830 MW by 1950, but in 1993 it was replaced by a new building whose main task is to supply nearby industry and the city of Hürth with process steam and district heating. Now Goldenberg has a capacity of 171 MW. Two modern fluidized bed boilers generate 1.3 billion kilowatt hours of electricity per year from 1.6 million tons of coal.

In 1953/1955, the first three units of the new Weisweiler power plant near Eschweiler were built, each with 350 MW. By 1975, the plant had been expanded to 2258 MW with two units of approx. 600 MW. Coal input in 2003 was 20.9 million tons for 18.3 billion kilowatt hours of electricity. The Inden open pit mine was opened up in 1953 solely to supply coal to this power plant.

The Frimmersdorf power plant near Grevenbroich was expanded from 1955 to 1970 to a total net capacity of 2136 MW. It has twelve units of 150 MW each and two units of 300 MW each. In 2003, its coal consumption was 22.2 million tons to generate 17.0 billion kilowatt hours of electricity.

The Neurath power plant near Grevenbroich was built between 1972 and 1976 with three units of 300 MW each and two units of 600 MW each. It consumes 18.9 million tons of coal for 16.5 billion kilowatt hours. Since January 2006, two new units with optimized plant technology (BoA) of 1100 MW each have been under construction and should be connected to the grid in 2010. The laying of the foundation stone on August 23, 2006, was also attended by Minister President Jürgen Rüttgers and German Chancellor Angela Merkel, thus highlighting the importance of the construction. However, fatal accidents at the construction site in subsequent years set back the schedule. Both units had been in test operation since May and October 2011, respectively, and final commissioning with notification of the units to the EEX power exchange took place on July 8, 2012 (Unit G) and August 3 (Unit F). On August 15, 2012, the new units were officially commissioned in the presence of North Rhine-Westphalia's Minister President Hannelore Kraft, Federal Environment Minister Peter Altmaier and other guests.

The Niederaussem power plant near Bergheim, planned in the 1960s as the Fortuna IV power plant, replaced the Fortuna I, II and III power plants, which produced from 1912 to 1988, starting in 1963 with two units of 150 MW each, four units of 300 MW each, two units of 600 MW each and the 1000 MW unit of a lignite-fired power plant with optimized plant technology (BoA) established in 2003 with currently 3864 MW gross and 3627 MW net. Coal consumption in 2003 was 23.7 million tons for 24.1 billion kilowatt hours - still excluding the BoA unit.

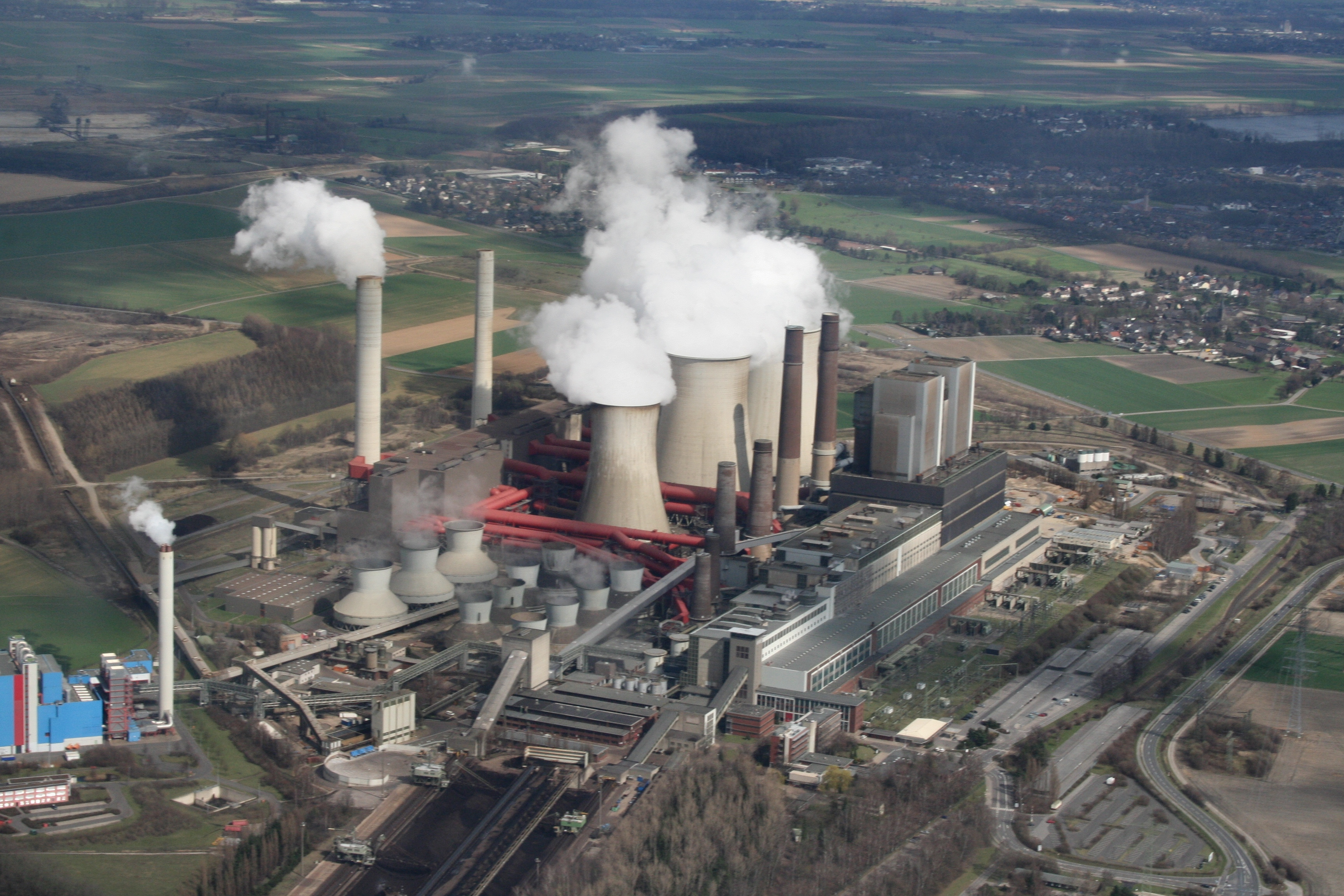
Weisweiler power station

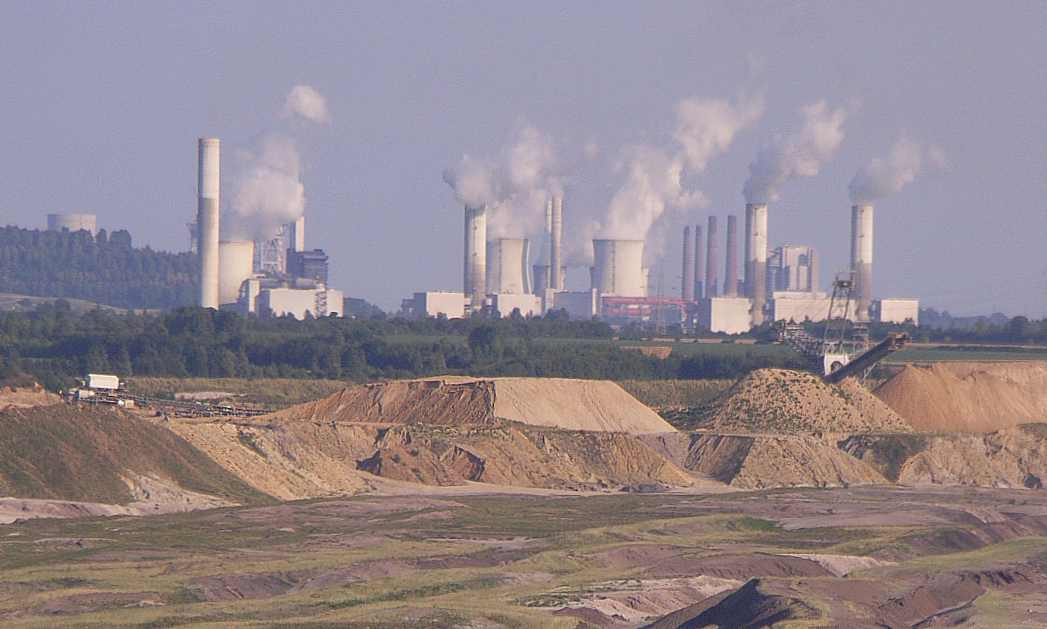
Frimmersdorf power station

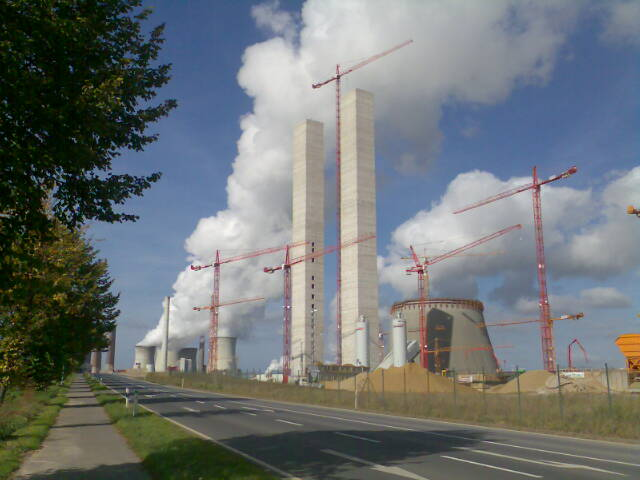
Neurath optimised power station

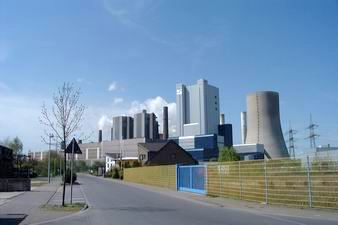
Niederaußem optimised power station

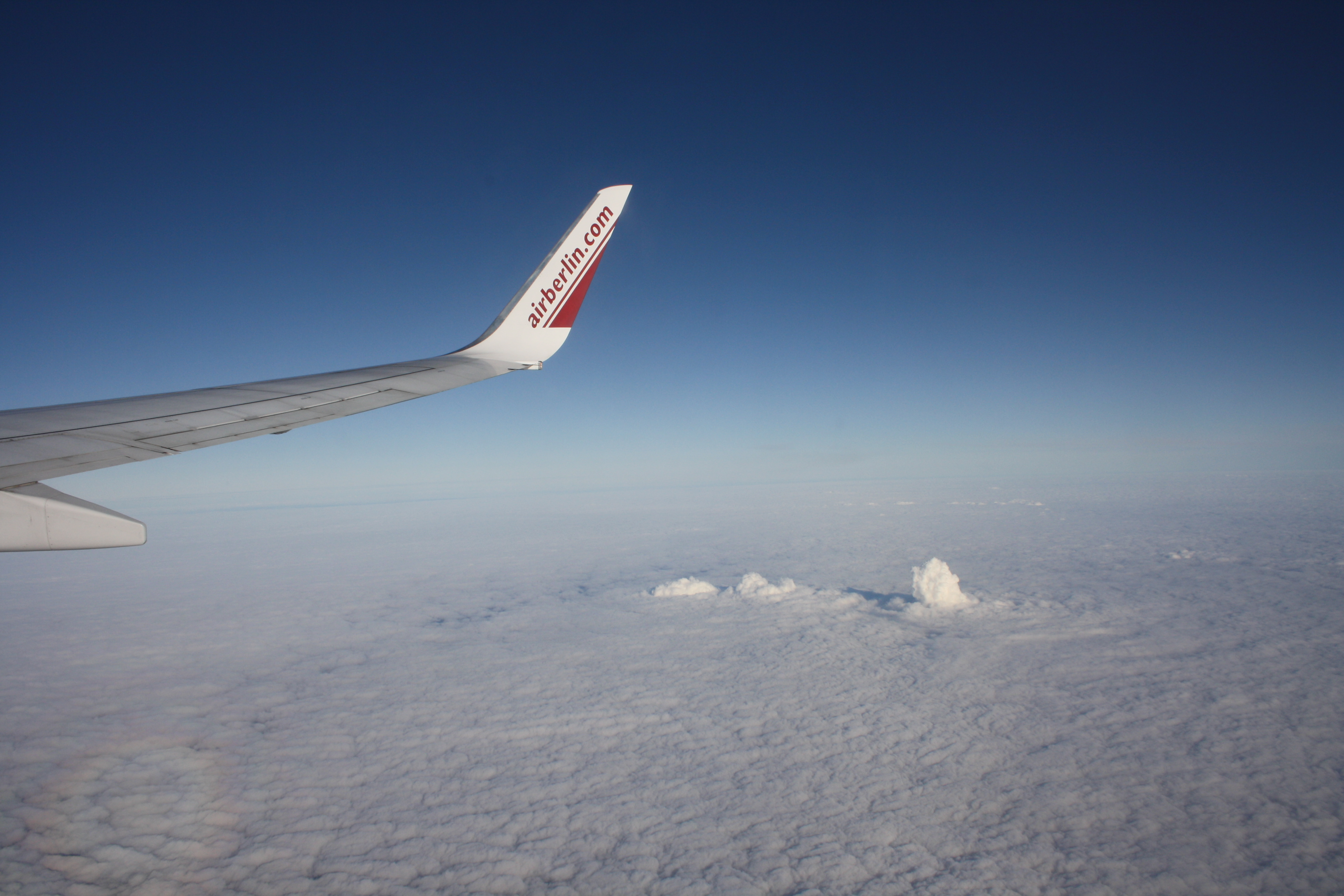
Clouds from cooling towers penetrating the clouds

==== Large open pit mines ====
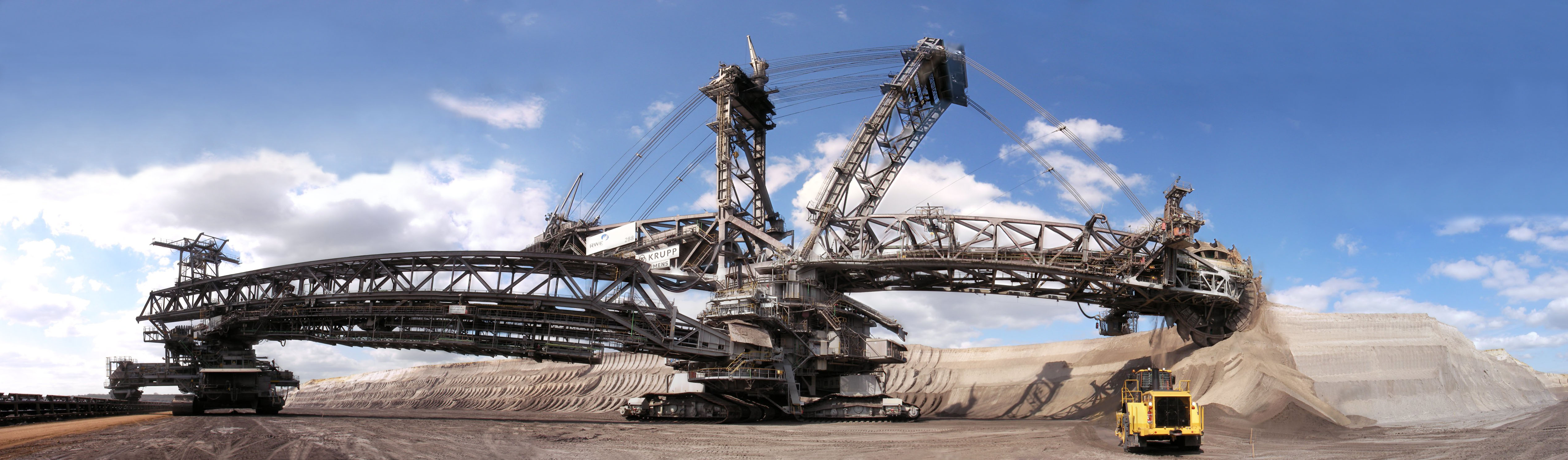
Bucket wheel excavator 288 in the Garzweiler opencast mine

Crude coal production in the Rhenish mining area reached its absolute maximum in 1984 at 120.6 million tons. Since 2002, annual production has remained at a level of around 100 million tons. Following the phasing out and recultivation of the opencast mines in the Middle District, three large opencast mines are still producing today: Garzweiler open pit mine, Hambach open pit mine and, in the western district, the Inden open pit mine. The Garzweiler II open pit mine was approved by NRW Environment Minister Klaus Matthiesen in 1995 and started in 2006. All three large opencast mines mine coal around a pivot point according to the fan principle. The mining front is followed by the tipping front in the same direction of rotation. According to the German Lignite Industry Association (DEBRIV)/Bundesverband Braunkohle, coal production in the coalfield in 2007 was 99.8 million tons. Production in Germany totaled 180.4 million tons. This was 2.3% higher than in the previous year..

Germany has long been the world's largest producer of lignite: In the period 1800 to 2007, 7,303 million metric tons were produced in the Rhenish mining area. For all German coalfields, lignite production during this period amounts to 24,405 million tons.

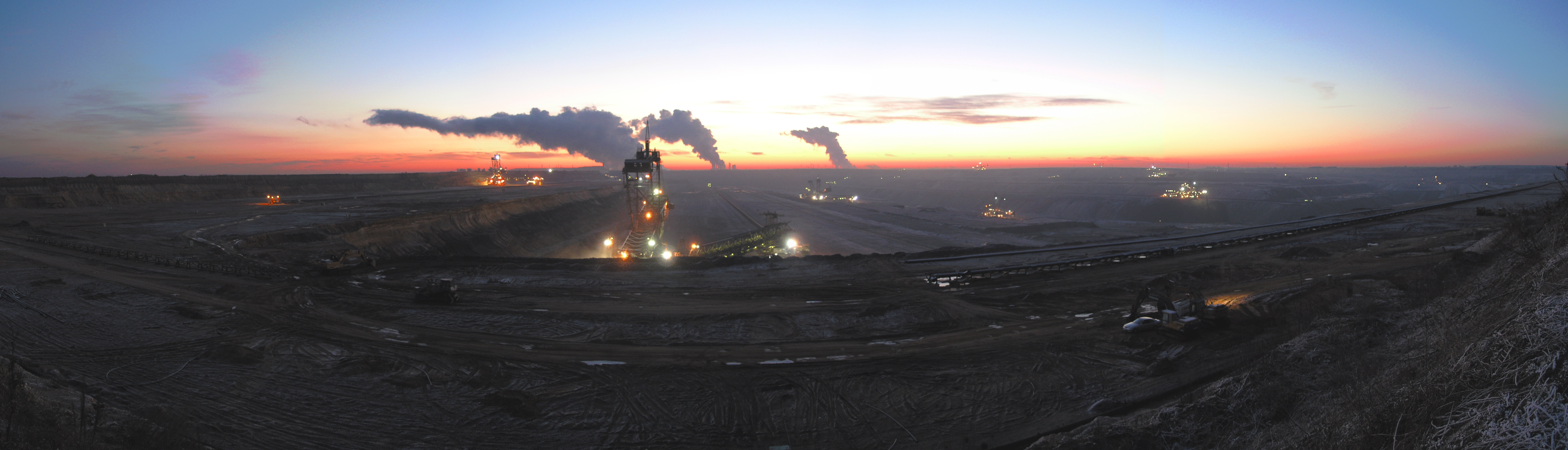
Garzweiler open-cast mine with the Frimmersdorf, Neurath and Niederaussem power stations in the background (2004)

== Future planning ==
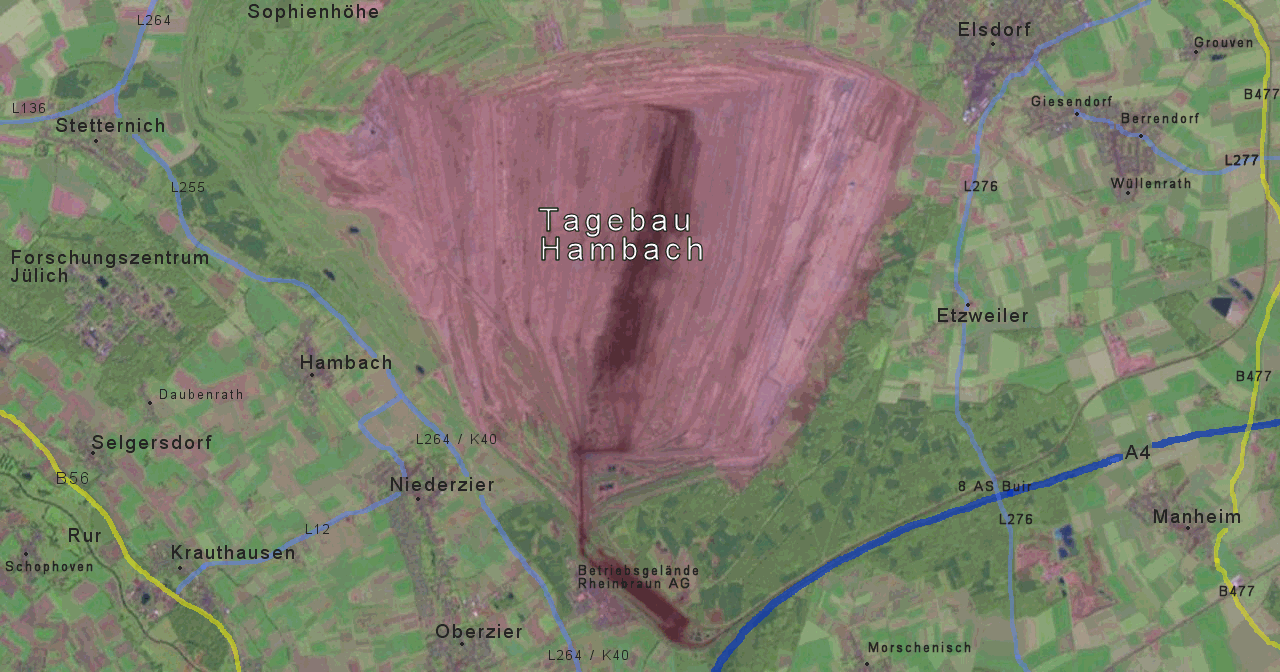
Hambach opencast mine, NASA satellite image

According to the original planning, the Hambach and Garzweiler II opencast mines will be exhausted around 2040–2045. The Inden open pit mine will have to stop production around ten years earlier. However, a comprehensive modernization of the Rhenish lignite-fired power plants is currently underway. Due to the higher efficiency of the new power plant units, this could extend the dismantling period. Nevertheless, it is expected that the currently approved mining areas will be exhausted between 2050 and 2060 at the latest. Press reports in October 2013 indicated that the Group intends to shut down eleven of its lignite-fired power plant units and close the Garzweiler open pit mine by 2018. Apparently, lignite-based power generation will no longer be profitable in the future. Although the company immediately denied that it was withdrawing from the Garzweiler open pit mine, the city of Erkelenz subsequently halted further resettlement plans..

The development of a new open pit mine takes a relatively long time due to the lengthy approval process and the extensive preparatory work, including the necessary resettlements, but then results in secure power generation for decades.

=== Tagebau Hambach II ===
Furthermore, there were plans to expand the Hambach open pit mine to Hambach II, which was to extend in a northeasterly direction across the communities of Elsdorf, Niederembt and Oberembt to Margaretenhöhe in an easterly direction.

Northeast of Elsdorf-Angelsdorf, Rheinbraun (now RWE Power) had already begun to acquire some land in the 1990s in order to build the Neu-Etzweiler resettlement site there from 1994 to 2001. Realization therefore seems unlikely.

=== Floating solar park ===
In May 2020, Meyer Burger, a manufacturer of solar cell production machines, presented an idea for a solar park in the Hambach open pit mine. This would enable electricity to be generated during the day in fine weather with a peak output of around ten gigawatts, which would roughly correspond to the continuous output of the Weisweiler, Neurath, Niederaussem and Frimmersdorf coal-fired power plants, which today depend on the opencast mines. Considerations for later use of the gigantic area covering 50 square kilometers envisage flooding to create a lake landscape.

The idea received encouragement from physicist Uwe Rau and others., der RWE Power AG and the Minister for Economic Affairs, Innovation, Digitalization and Energy of North Rhine-Westphalia, Andreas Pinkwart.

== Political planning and decision-making processes ==
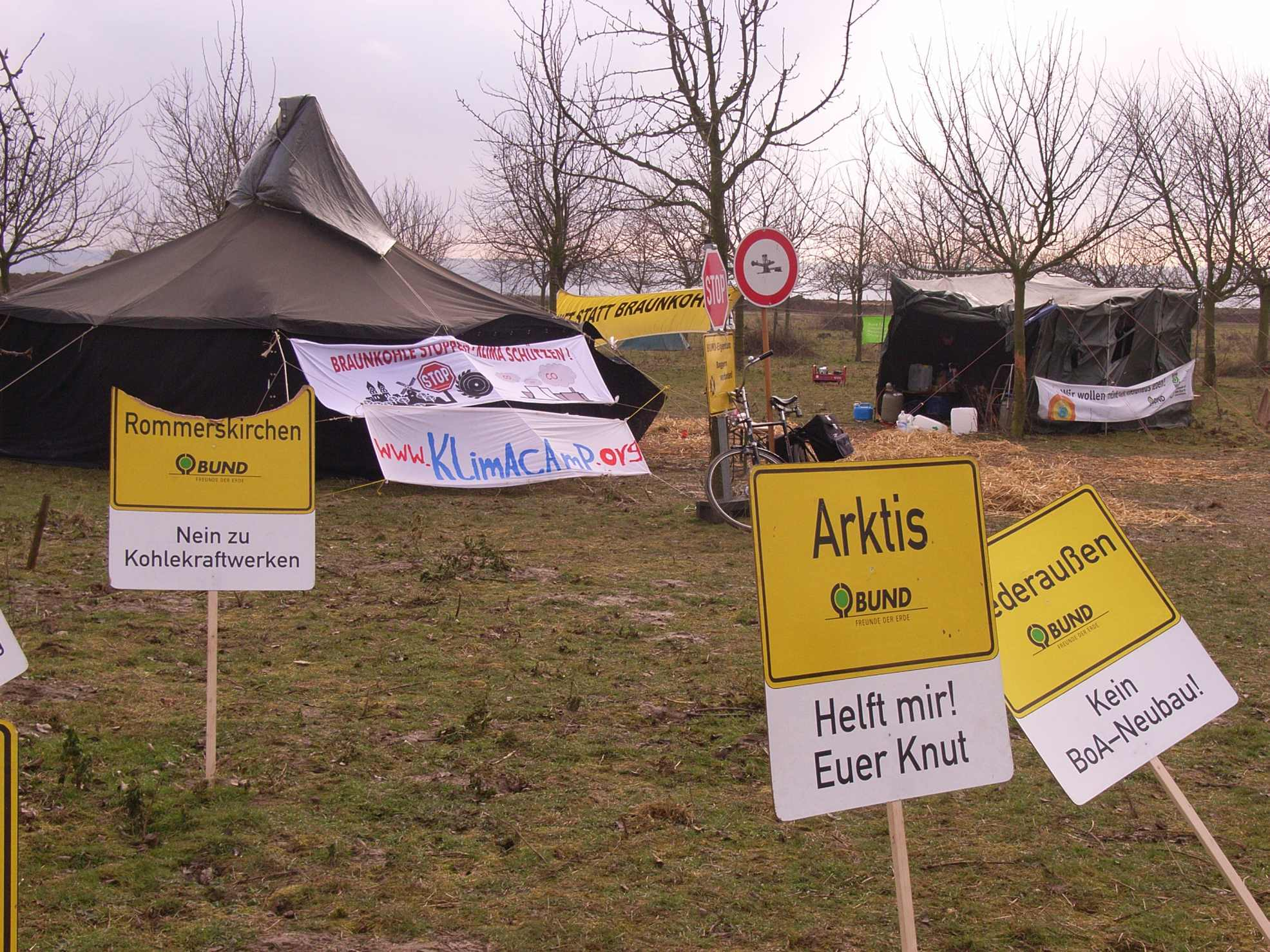
Protest by opponents of the anti-coal mining movement at a BUND orchard on the edge of the Garzweiler II mine near Otzenrath

Planning for lignite mining and the associated issues and problems are negotiated in the Lignite Committee at the Cologne regional government and decided on by the state government as the Lignite Plan. The 40-member Lignite Committee is made up of representatives of the municipalities, the Cologne and Düsseldorf regional councils and officials from business and employee organizations. The environmental associations repeatedly complain about the close links between local and state politics on the one hand and RWE on the other. In the eyes of the environmental associations, this makes the Lignite Committee a very one-sided decision-making body. Particularly controversial recently was the approval for the Garzweiler II open pit mine granted by the SPD government shortly before the 1995 state elections. A total of 19,000 objections had been submitted to the Cologne district government. This made the subsequent formation of a red-green government coalition in NRW more difficult.. Compromises were aimed at revising the lignite plan, but ultimately did not call the opencast mining project into question. In 2004, the RWE affair once again cast the RWE Group's "political landscaping" in a negative light.

== Ecological and social issues ==
The problem of degradation is multifaceted. Here are the most important problem areas:

=== Water management ===
To keep the open pits dry, groundwater has to be pumped down to depths of more than 500 meters. This causes streams and wetlands to dry out, which are then irrigated artificially in some cases. In addition, the soil structure changes, and there is widespread subsidence of the soil, in some cases up to distances of 15 to 20 kilometers.

The groundwater body regenerates only very slowly at great depths. Critics of the opencast mines also accuse the operators of not having comprehensive enough knowledge about groundwater flows at greater depths. In 1997, for example, there was a water intrusion at the Hambach open pit mine in which water at a temperature of 40 °C flowed into the mine over a period of several months. Fears that this water might be communicating with the Aachen thermal springs could be refuted by experts.

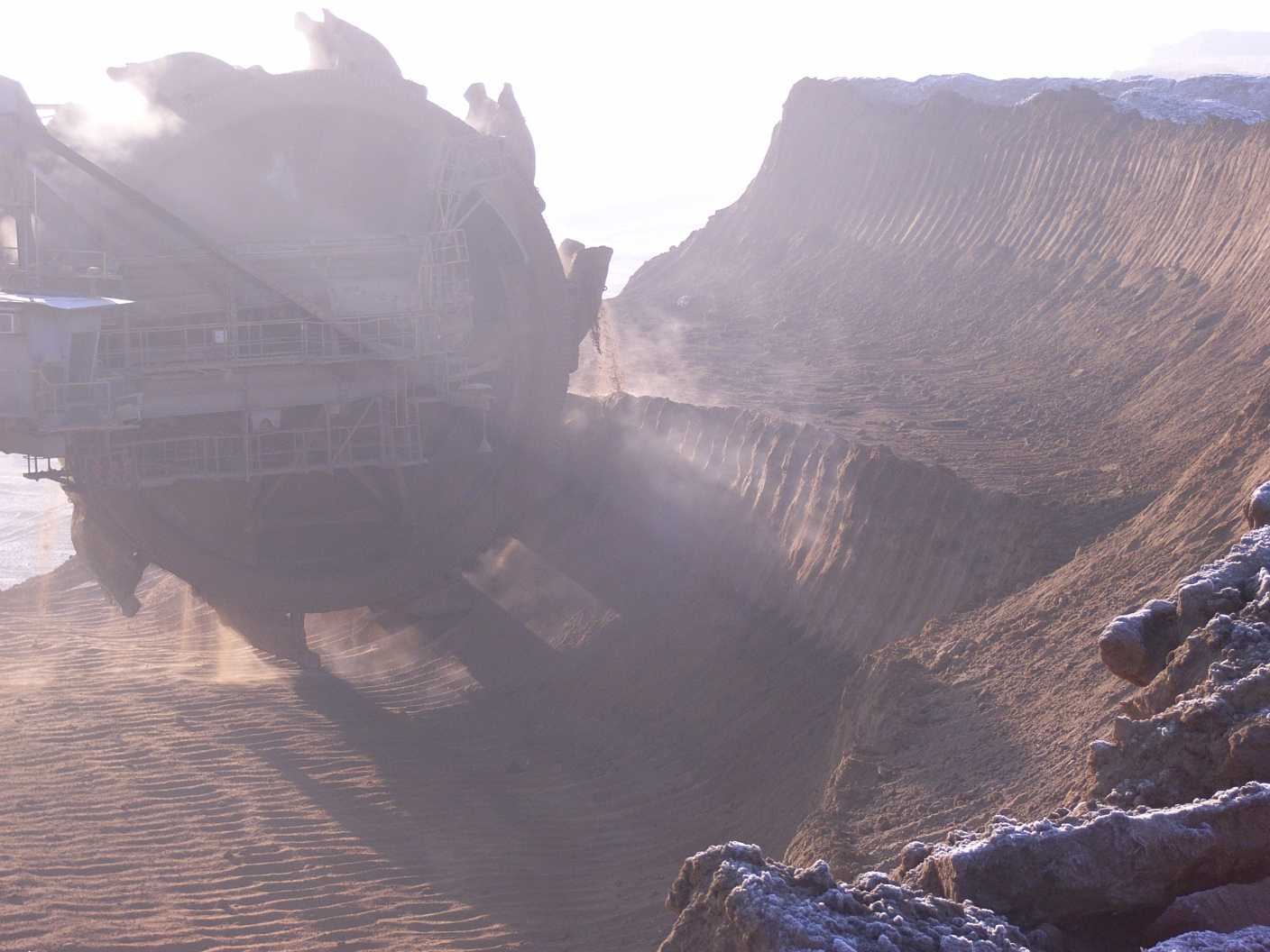
Paddle wheel

Due to groundwater lowering, trees and field crops lose their connection to the groundwater. There are also negative consequences for arable farming.

=== Particulate matter pollution ===
Since 2004, measurements by the State Environment Agency at the edge of the opencast mines have shown that the particulate matter caused by mining is well above the EU limits. It remains to be seen whether the countermeasures initiated by RWE Power are correspondingly effective. The share of fine dust originating from the Hambach open pit mine is given by the NRW State Office for Nature, Environment and Consumer Protection (LANUV) as 25%. 71% is attributed to general background pollution. For the year 2004, no complete measurement year was listed by the LANUV NRW for exceedances of the fine dust limit value of 50 μg/m^{3}. Permitted are 35 exceedances per year. The permitted annual mean value of 40 μg/m^{3} is clearly undercut for 2004 with 30 μg/m^{3}, at the Niederzier measuring station. The new limit values have been in effect since January 1, 2005. An action plan to reduce particulate matter in the vicinity of the Hambach opencast mine was drawn up under the auspices of the Cologne district government and came into force on September 29, 2005. RWE Power began implementing measures to reduce particulate matter. According to LANUV NRW, 35 exceedances were recorded in Niederzier in 2006. This corresponded to the permitted days of exceedance. The annual mean value fell to 29 μg/m^{3} for this period.

Measures to reduce particulate matter in opencast mines:

- Anpflanzen von Bäumen auf der Abraumseite
- Förderung des Grasbewuchses auf brachliegenden Flächen (z. B. Aussaat)
- Befestigung der Zufahrten und des Untergrunds der Bandanlagen
- Berieseln der oberen Sohle auf der Baggerseite und der Endböschungen
- Berieseln von Kohlebunker und Kohlebändern sowie des Abraums während der Abtragung
- Planting of trees on the spoil side. Promotion of grass growth on fallow areas (e.g. seeding) Paving of the access roads and the subsoil of the conveyor systems Sprinkling of the upper bottom on the dredge side and the end slopes Sprinkling of coal bunkers and coal belts as well as the overburden during excavation

=== Mercury emissions ===
The operation of lignite-fired power plants is associated with high mercury emissions. In 2011 and 2012, the Neurath and Niederaussem plants each emitted 497 kilograms of the nerve agent into the atmosphere per year.

=== Climate change ===
==== Greenhouse gas emissions ====
Burning lignite in the district's power plants also emits high levels of carbon dioxide, the greenhouse gas mainly responsible for global warming. The power plant with the highest proportionate emissions in Germany is the Frimmersdorf power plant with 1270 grams of CO_{2} per kilowatt hour. The Weisweiler, Neurath and Niederaussem plants take fourth to sixth place after two eastern German plants, with 1180, 1150 and 1119 grams per kilowatt hour respectively. By way of comparison, the power plant ranked 30th among the "dirtiest" lignite-fired power plants in Europe emitted 950 grams per kilowatt hour. The values for hard coal power plants are about 100 grams per kWh lower. The average value in the German electricity mix, including wind, hydro, nuclear and photovoltaic plants, was 530 grams per kilowatt-hour in 2006. Total emissions in 2006 were 27.4 million tons of carbon dioxide for the Niederaussem site, 19.3 million tons for Frimmersdorf, 18.8 million tons for Weisweiler and 17.9 million tons for Neurath. Together, this accounts for over 27% of CO_{2} emissions in North Rhine-Westphalia. The political disputes surrounding the approval of the Garzweiler II opencast mine also put the RWE Group under public pressure to invest large sums in more efficient power plant technology. At the Weisweiler power plant, investments of 150 million euros are said to have increased efficiency from 36 to 40 percent by 2006. BoA's Neurath power plant cost around 2.6 billion euros. In 2006, BUND described this as a "zero-sum game in terms of climate protection policy"; the new power plant would also continue to burn large amounts of coal.

=== Remaining holes ===
Backfilling the three large opencast mines currently in operation is costly, but nevertheless required by law. Due to the enormous volume of lignite mined and the overburden deposited on external dumps, the operator no longer wants to backfill them completely. This could save RWE around 250 million euros. At times, the Hambach open pit mine was described as one of the largest man-made holes on earth because of its mining depth of up to 470 m.

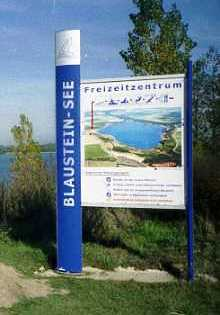
Blausteinsee at Eschweiler

The Sophienhöhe, as the largest external dump, has a volume of about one cubic kilometer. These quantities cannot simply be dumped back into the open pits. Therefore, it is planned to fill the remaining holes with water. The dimensions of these lakes would be considerable: The lake of the Inden open pit mine, for example, would be the size of Lake Tegernsee. In terms of water volume, the residual lake of the Hambach open pit mine would only be surpassed in Germany by Lake Constance, but it would be significantly deeper than the latter. Since these lakes have no natural inflow and outflow, discussions are currently underway on how to channel these large volumes of water into the holes. What impact these large bodies of water will have on the climate of the Rhineland is still unclear. It will also take quite some time before the lakes are completely filled, according to current estimates until the year 2090.

Some neighboring communities are hoping for an upsurge in tourism. Experience with the Central German lignite mining area in the Halle-Leipzig region with residual holes already flooded there (Central German Lake District) shows that tourism increased there just three to five years after flooding began. However, backfilling via a belt would only take 20 years and could also open up new farmland again. According to critics, the creation of large inland lakes brings hardly any economic or agricultural benefit compared to backfilling or at least partial filling with the creation of a few smaller lakes, and deprives large areas of land of the design and disposal of future generations.

=== Flora and fauna ===
Due to the fertile loess soil, the area was used for agriculture in some areas before lignite mining and the natural vegetation was accordingly relatively far removed from its natural state. The clearing of old-growth forests such as the Hambach Forest is to be compensated for by new plantings, as has already been done in many areas. However, it takes several decades until the young trees have grown up and a stable plant community has established itself again. To assess the quality of the current plant inventory, the diversity of species, the presence of indicator species and Red List species are taken into account. For the investigated sites, a surprising diversity of native species was found. However, in the case of Sophienhöhe, which was afforested only twenty years ago, this diversity is attributed to the fact that the forest plant community is still in the process of development. However, it is a cause for concern that the mining of lignite will result in the loss of sites whose waterlogging provided special growing conditions for plants. As a result, the plant species that specialize in this area will decline, and with them the species richness in the region. One of the endangered animal species is the Bechstein's bat, which lives in the area of influence of the Hambach open pit mine. The planned relocation of the A4 here will cut through their network of roosts and make costly "overflight aids" necessary.

=== Resettlement ===
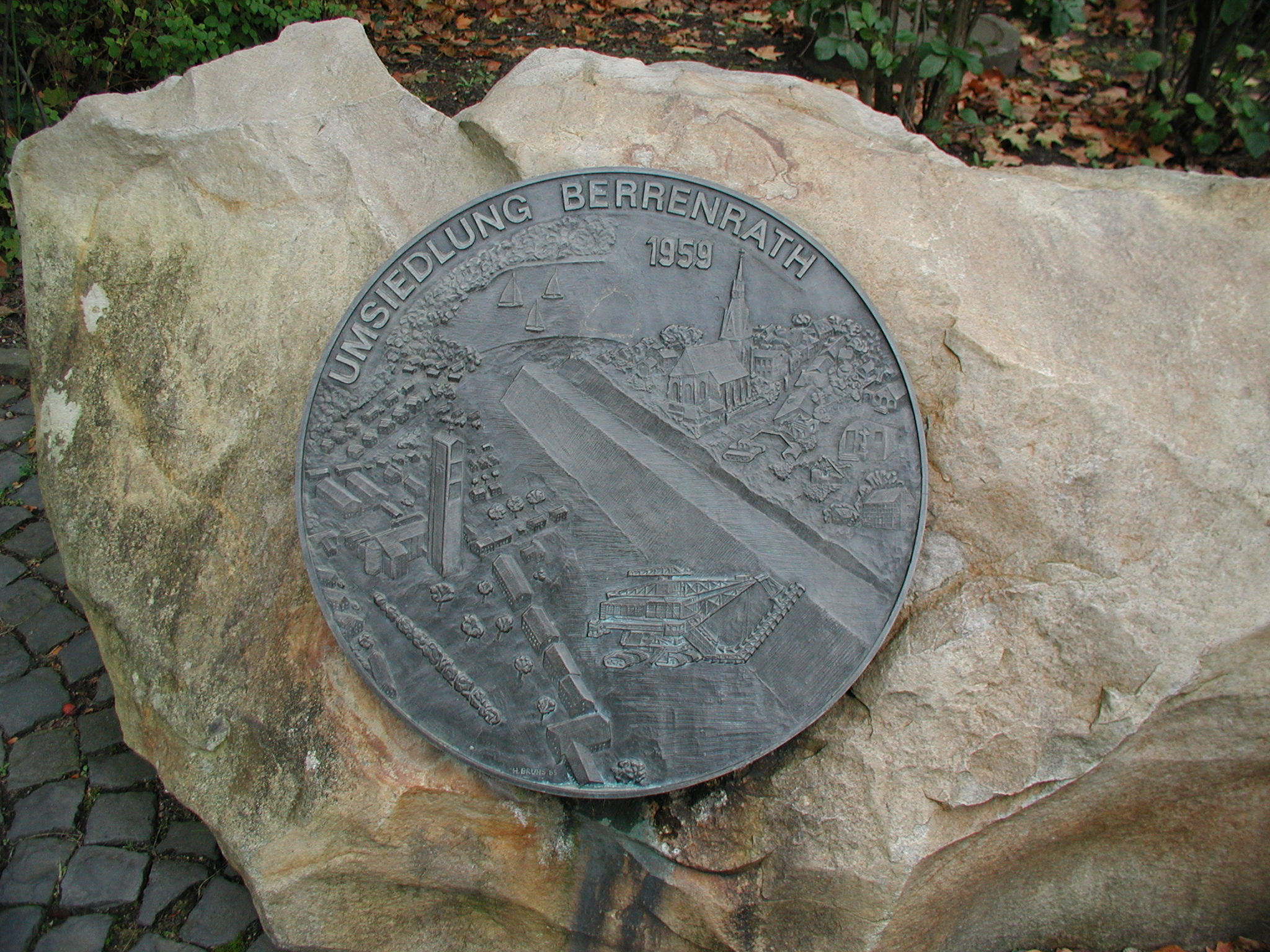
Memorial stone to the resettlement of Berrenrath in 1959

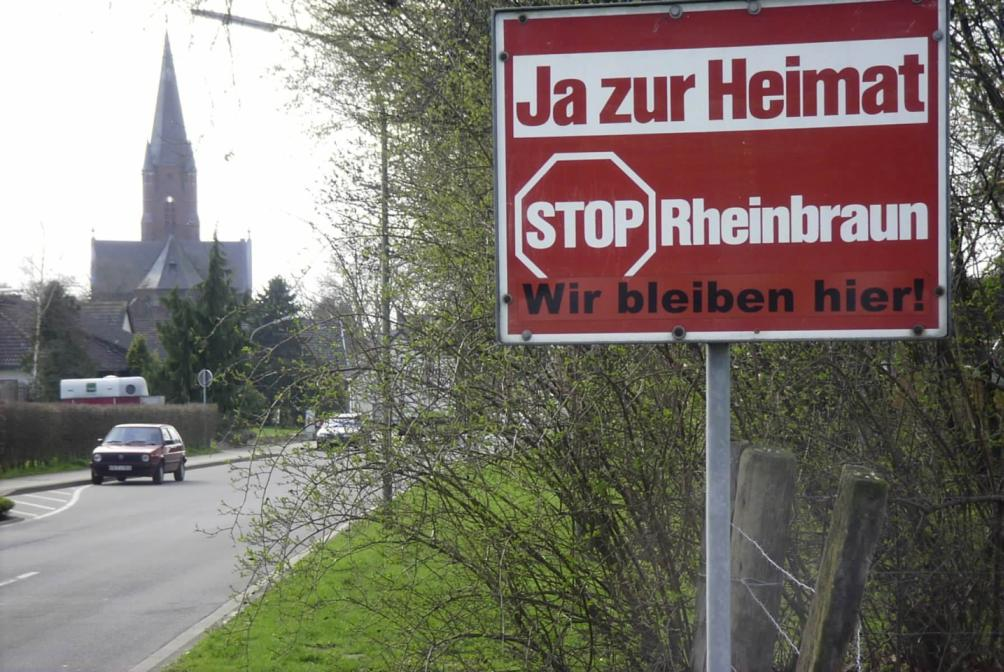
Protest against the planned resettlement of entire villages in the Garzweiler open-cast mine area

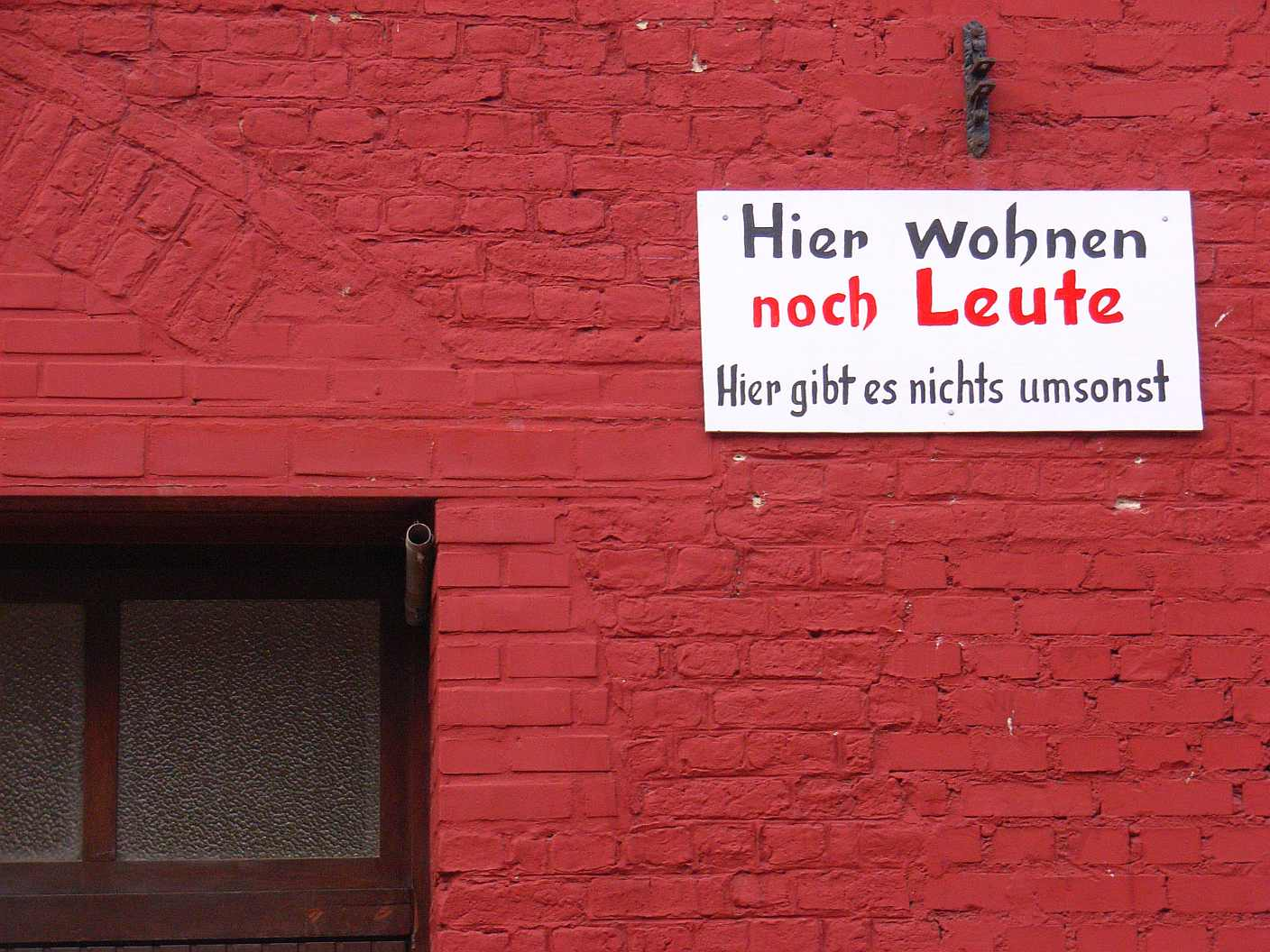
Signs of life from the last inhabitants of Pesch (Erkelenz)

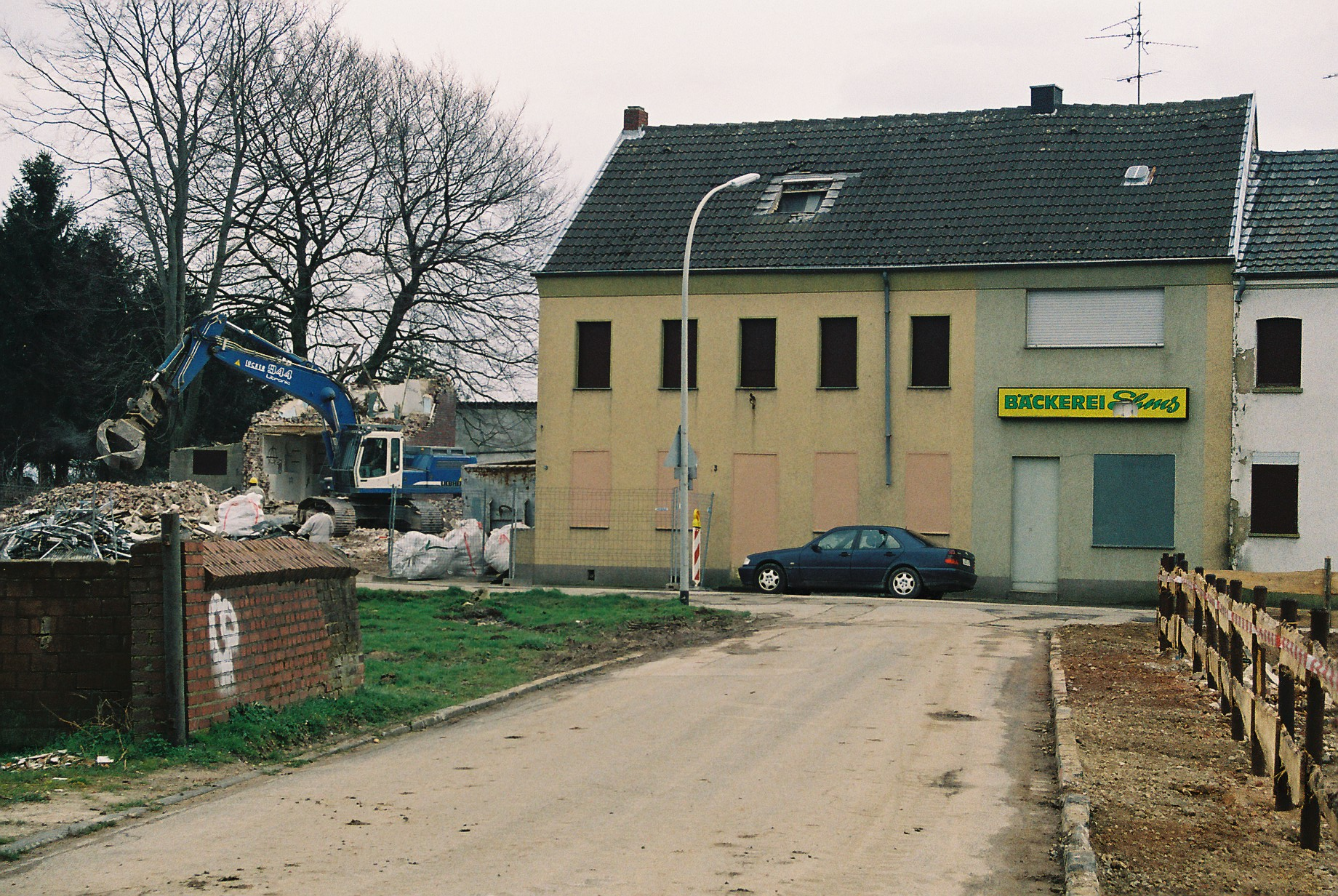
Demolition of the village of Holz (Jüchen)

Lignite mining destroys large areas of agricultural land for the duration of the mining operation and today requires the resettlement of entire villages with a total of several thousand people. In doing so, the open pit mine operators invoke German mining law. Farmers are often resettled over 30 kilometers or more in the vicinity of freshly recultivated farmland, an undertaking that involves many conversion difficulties and adjustments to the new agricultural conditions. Resettlement is even more complex in the case of villages. Since the old villages are leveled completely and in one fell swoop, new residential areas have to be planned and developed in time in remote areas of the communities and cities, and thus entire districts have to be created anew. However, there are also opportunities created by the new development: the infrastructure is modernized and larger settlement units can be created. When villages that have grown up are relocated, the residents not only lose their homes, but also their social fabric. For this reason, RWE endeavors to bring the residents of a community unit together in a new settlement, as was the case with Berrenrath and Mödrath in the 1950s. The village community is supposed to be preserved by resettling them as cohesively as possible. Unfortunately, this does not always succeed satisfactorily. Commuters, for example, whose daily commute to work is becoming much longer, prefer to settle in other towns closer to their place of work. While only 60% of Garzweiler's residents resettled together at the end of the 1980s, the resettlement of the Jüchen district of Otzenrath, which was finally demolished in 2006, succeeded in settling around 80% of the old village population at the new location. The continuation of the village community in the new location can arise mainly from social ties that have been saved. Thus, the associations and the festive culture play a central role in ensuring that resettlement is perceived as "successful" by those affected.

Time and again, there are disputes about the amounts of compensation. Since RWE Power uses the current value of the buildings as a basis, the compensation is often not sufficient to rebuild a house of roughly comparable size, all the more so when modern building standards have to be taken into account. The size of the surrounding garden land is also rarely recovered.

Resettlement is often preceded by gradual desertification. Villages that are affected by mining plans often experience a decline in population long before this happens. This is because new industries or commercial enterprises do not settle here because of the poor business prospects, and already established businesses no longer expand and try to relocate to more developable areas in advance of the official relocation. This reduces the supply of jobs in the community. The young population, which is already rather difficult to retain, migrates to more promising business locations and residential areas with more attractive recreational opportunities. This development is exacerbated by the fact that new building applications in the open-cast mining planning areas are rejected at an early stage because of the unfavorable prospects for the future, and the development of building land is often frozen. These phenomena slow down the further development of the villages and gradually make them deserted. For lignite mining, however, this improves the initial situation: the number of households to be relocated is reduced, compensation payments are lower as a result and, at the same time, land prices in the mining area fall.

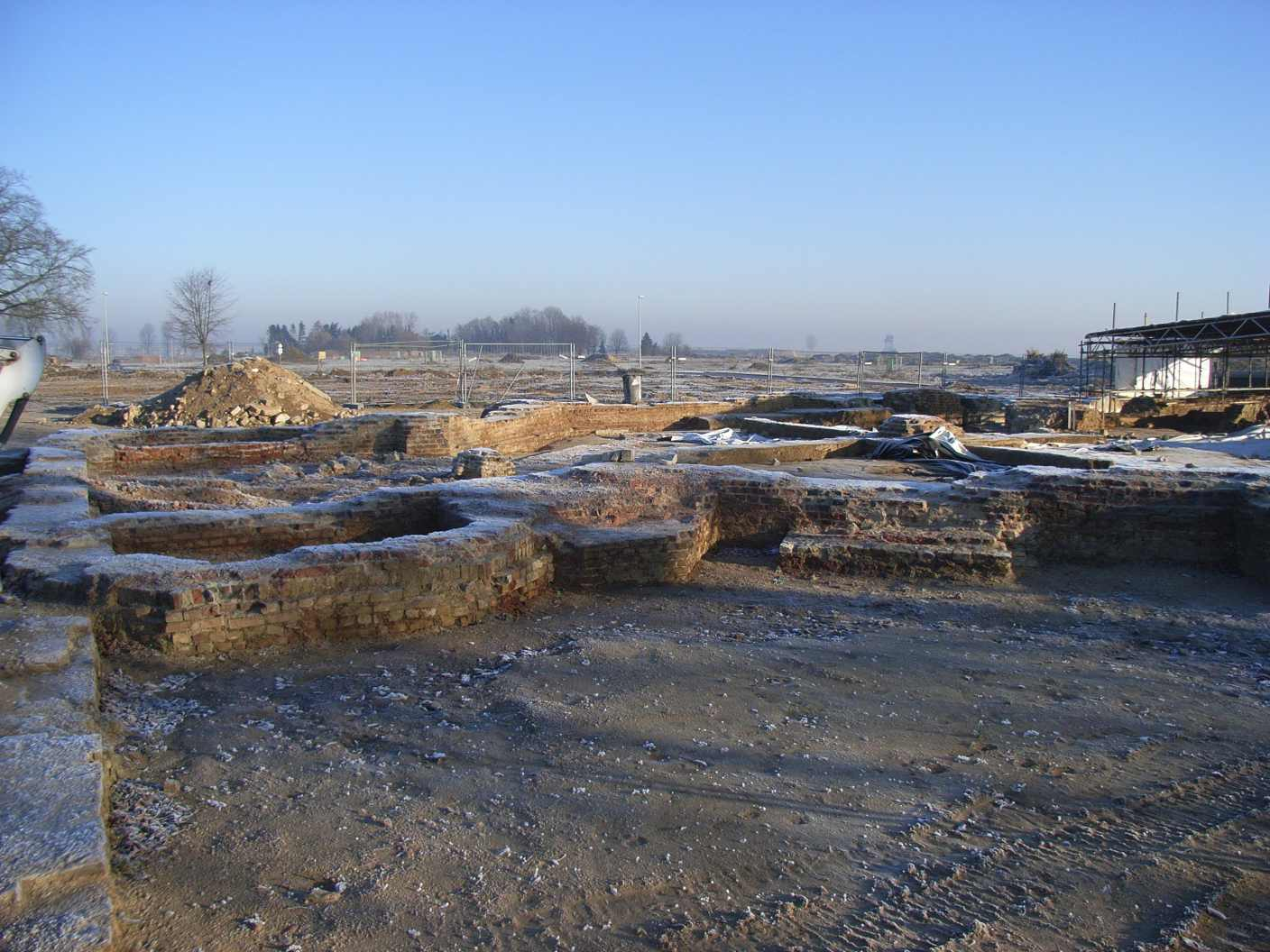
Exposure of church foundations in the former village of Otzenrath

=== Loss of archaeological sites ===
What the excavators dig up is irretrievably destroyed. This also applies to archaeological sites. The Rhineland Office for the Preservation of Archaeological Monuments maintains a field office in Titz, where scientists, excavation technicians and excavation workers are employed for the individual opencast mines. However, only about five percent of the known sites can be systematically investigated.. The polluter-pays principle that otherwise applies in North Rhine-Westphalia does not apply here. In the course of open-cast lignite mining, there were numerous important archaeological researches and discoveries, but most of them were only able to open up a fraction of the actual existing sources.

=== Possible mining damage ===
Surveyors from the geological service are warning of possible mining damage in the surrounding region. There are also warnings about the danger of wet cellars, as the groundwater level will rise again as soon as RWE stops operating the open pit mine. Experts suspect that in the next 40 years there will be damages amounting to 180 million euros due to mining damage caused by RWE.

=== External costs of lignite ===
Emissions of carbon dioxide, nitrogen oxides, mercury, sulfur oxides, dust and noise, land consumption, and the impairment of surrounding water bodies result in external costs for lignite extraction and power generation. The DIW estimates these costs at 6 to 12 ct/kWh. According to the DIW, if these costs were included in the price of electricity, coal-fired power generation would become uneconomical..

== Tourist and monument preservation development of the mining area ==
Viewpoint Römerturm on the Sophienhöhe

Similar to the recultivated lake landscape in the Ville, the high dumps visible from afar, such as the Vollrather Höhe, Glessener Höhe and Sophienhöhe, have been opened up for leisure activities with networks of paths. On the Goltsteinkuppe near Lucherberg at the Inden open pit mine stands an observation building costing over 5 million euros, the Indemann, which opened in August 2009. The history of the lignite mining area has so far been presented in the form of a museum at RWE's information center in Paffendorf Castle. From here, various stations and vantage points in the coalfield are linked by an energy road. The German Mining Museum in Bochum presents the Rhenish coalfield in its own exhibition area. In view of the foreseeable end of lignite mining, the Rhineland Regional Association is endeavoring to record and, if necessary, preserve industrial monuments, workers' housing estates, the last briquette factories or large-scale technical equipment and to prepare their future networked presentation in the coalfield in the form of a lignite road..

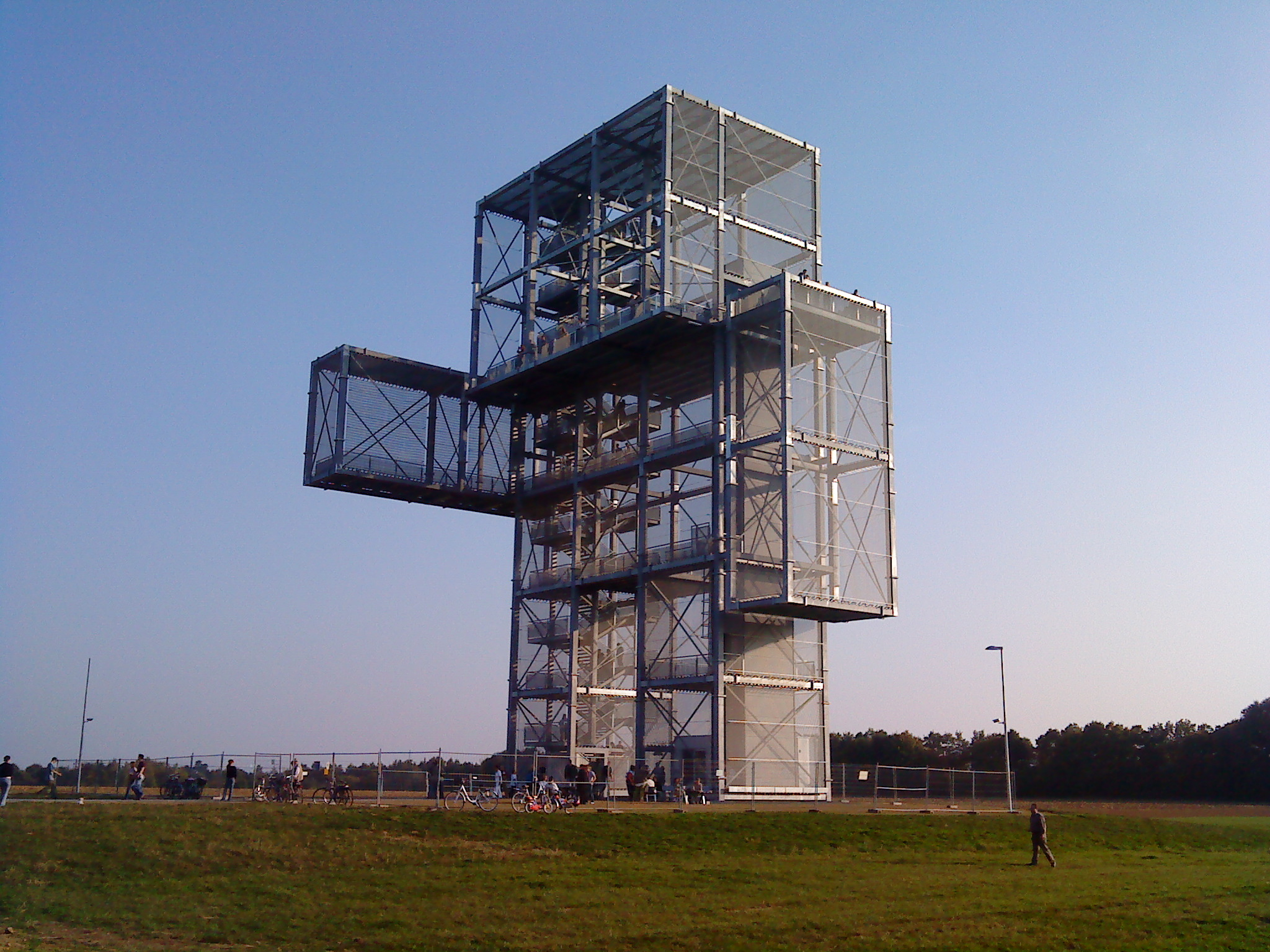
Indemann bei Inden

Among the remaining industrial architecture in the coalfield, the towering narrow building structures of the briquette factories are particularly striking. However, it is difficult to reconcile the interests of historic preservation with the other interests of the local authorities. In 2000, for example, an attempt to place the Carl briquette factory in Frechen completely under monument protection in order to be able to show the production process of a historic plant in an exemplary manner failed. Of ten building sections, the city has preserved three gutted buildings as part of a new district and commercial center.

Recently, it has also been proposed to preserve (in parts) the artificial landscape that open pit mining has created with enormous technical input and to make it accessible as a recreational and adventure landscape. This proposal is intended, on the one hand, as a strategy for use during the long operating periods of the opencast mines (40 years in the case of the Hambach opencast mine) and, on the other hand, as an alternative to the previous model of "natural" recultivation.

== See also ==
- RWE
- List of Hochkippen im Rheinischen Braunkohlerevier
- Liste von stillgelegten Bergwerken in Deutschland
- Liste deutscher Braunkohletagebaue
- Liste abgebaggerter Ortschaften
- Liste der abgerissenen Kirchengebäude im Rheinischen Braunkohlerevier
- Stiftung zur Förderung der Archäologie im rheinischen Braunkohlenrevier

== Literature ==
- Jürgen Bartel, Reinhart Zschocke: Die Ville und das Kölner Braunkohlengebiet. In: Emil Meynen u. a. (Hrsg.): Kölner Bucht und angrenzende Gebiete. (Sammlung Geographischer Führer, Band 6). Gebrüder Bornträger, Berlin/ Stuttgart 1972, ISBN 3-443-16002-6.
- Jakob Baumann, Bernd Wiese: Der Erftkreis – Natur, Mensch, Wirtschaft. (Geostudien 10). Selbstverlag, Köln 1986, DNB-IDN 891293248.
- Walter Buschmann, Norbert Gilson, Barbara Rinn: Braunkohlenbergbau im Rheinland, hg. vom Landschaftsverband Rheinland und MBV-NRW, 2008, ISBN 978-3-88462-269-8.
- Gerhard Curdes: Eine Parklandschaft des 21. Jahrhunderts zwischen Köln, Aachen und Mönchengladbach: Traum oder Chance? In: Julian Wékel (Hrsg. im Auftrag der Deutschen Akademie für Städtebau und Landesplanung): Neue Landschaften – Zum zukünftigen Umgang mit Freiraum. Vorbereitende Beiträge zur Jahrestagung 2004 in Münster. Berlin 2005, ISBN 3-9809331-2-1.
- Holger Kaiser, Frederik Petersohn: Opposition im Landtag von Nordrhein-Westfalen: Die CDU-Fraktion und der Braunkohletagebau "Garzweiler II" in der 12. Wahlperiode (1995–2000). Lit, Münster/ Berlin/ London 2007, ISBN 978-3-8258-0167-0.
- Arno Kleinebeckel: Unternehmen Braunkohle. Geschichte eines Rohstoffs, eines Reviers, einer Industrie im Rheinland. Greven, Köln 1986, ISBN 3-7743-0225-1.
- Landschaftsverband Rheinland, Rheinisches Amt für Denkmalpflege (Hrsg.): Cöllnisch Umbra. Das rheinische Braunkohlenrevier als Denkmallandschaft. Petersberg 2002, ISBN 3-935590-41-5.
- Wolfram Pflug (Hrsg.): Braunkohlentagebau und Rekultivierung. Springer, Berlin/ Heidelberg 1998, ISBN 3-540-60092-2.
- Ruhrlandmuseum Essen (Hrsg.): Zeitraum Braunkohle. Pomp, Essen 1993, ISBN 3-89355-091-7.
- Die Erdfresser – Tagebauanlage – Fortuna Garsdorf . Geo (Zeitschrift) 12/1976 Seite 78–96. Verlag Gruner + Jahr, Hamburg.
- Johann Paul: Risikodebatten über den Tieftagebau im rheinischen Braunkohlenrevier. In: Technikgeschichte, Band 65 (1998), H. 2, S. 141–161.
