= Zülpich Castle =

- Burg Zülpich
- Zülpich
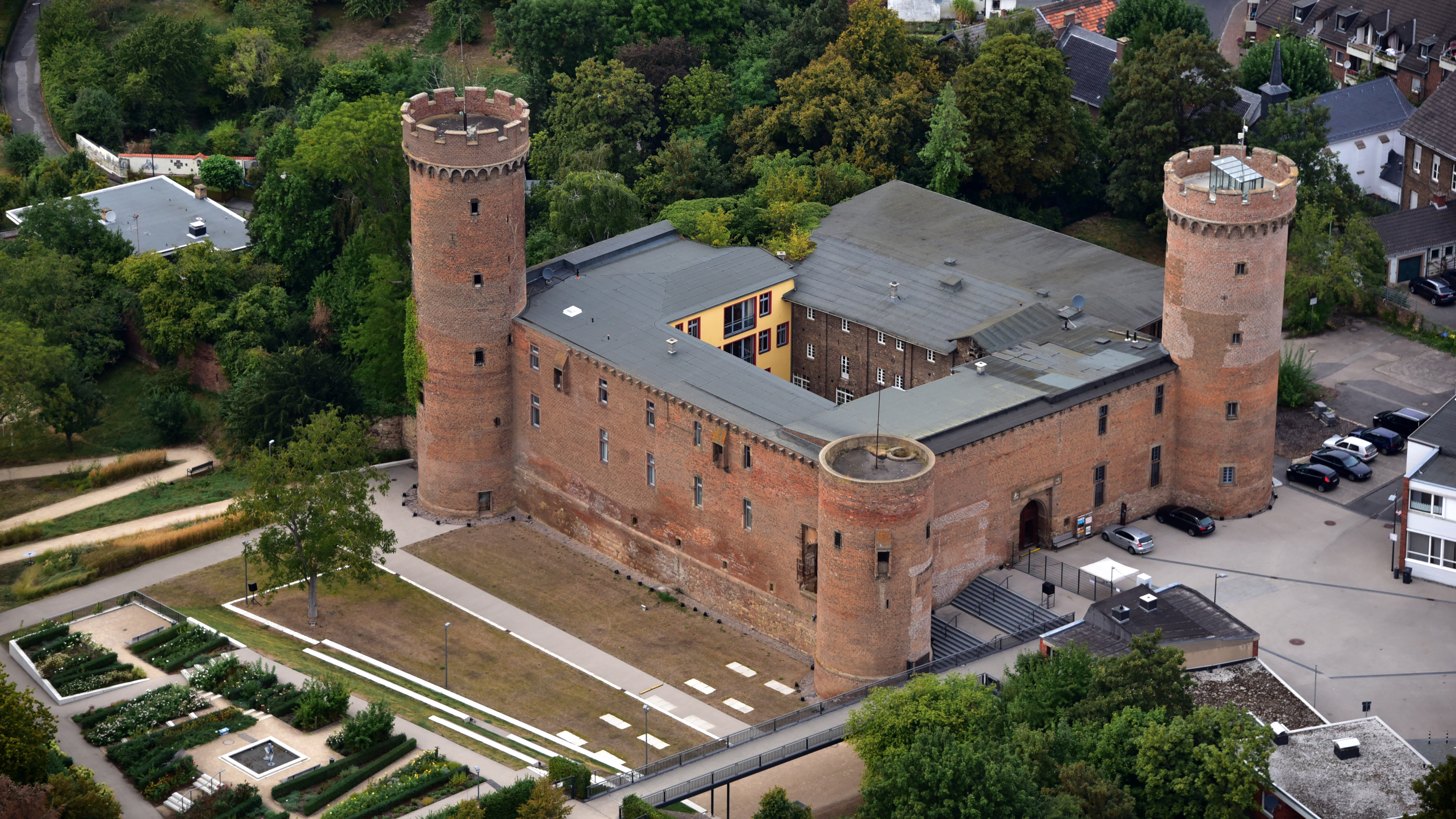
- Zülpich Castle from the south

Site information
- Type: lowland castle
- Code: DE-NW
- Condition: preserved or largely preserved

Location
- Coordinates: 50°41′25″N 6°38′49″E
- Height: Height missing, see template documentation

Site history
- Built: 14th century
- Materials: Brick

Garrison information
- Occupants: Clerics (archbishops of Cologne)

Zülpich Castle or the Electoral Cologne Sovereign Castle of Zülpich (German: Kurkölnische Landesburg Zülpich) is the landmark and symbol of the town of Zülpich in the German state of North Rhine-Westphalia. Its origins may be traced to a Roman castrum. The present site was built in the late 14th century as a symbol of sovereignty and outpost of the archbishops of Cologne against the County of Jülich.

Razed by French troops at the end of the 17th century, the ruins of the lowland castle ended up in private hands. The Zülpich manufacturing family of Sieger opened a schnaps distillery in the castle until 1870 that operated until the 1980s. In the Second World War it was badly damaged, was partly rebuilt in the 1950s and acts today as a tourist information bureau and home of the Zülpich History Society.

== Description ==
Zülpich Castle is a modest brick building with an almost rectangular plan with high towers at the corners. It is one of the classic quadrangular castles of a type ideal for the Late Middle Ages. Its austere-looking defences are almost entirely devoid of architectural features and underline its fortress-like character which befits its location at the southwestern corner of the medieval town of Zülpich and its incorporation into the town's fortifications.

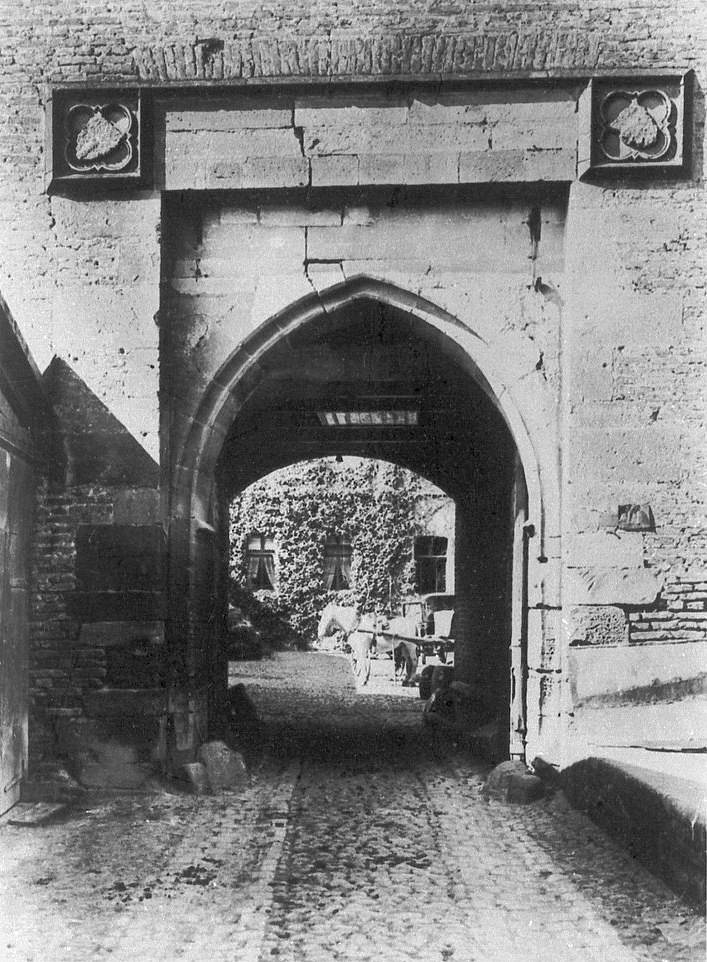
The castle gate in the late 19th century

The enclosed quadrangular structure was originally surrounded by a moat up to twelve metres wide. At its southern, western and eastern corners are round towers that were all once four storeys high. The southern one was reduced to two storeys high in the 19th century as it had fallen into disrepair. In the north and at right angles is a square tower measuring 10×10 metres with corner ashlars that is the only survivor of an older castle. Its shape clearly shows that it was given its present appearance in the 17th century. The two full-height round towers are topped by protruding, open fighting platforms with brick battlements. The corbels also use trachyte as a material, while the ogival arched frieze above is made of tuff. All the round corner towers once had residential rooms with fireplaces and garderobes. In the walls (which are up to three metres thick) are spiral staircases. The western tower facing the town also acted as a dungeon.

The four wings were formerly two-storey residential ranges with high basement vaults. Today only the thick outside walls have survived; these served a dual purpose as defensive walls with projecting chemins de ronde. The remaining structure of the present-day wing dates to a later period because the original roofs and interior walls from the 17th century have not survived. The external façade of the southwest wall is divided into regular axes by high, narrow, Gothic rectangular windows with lighter cut stone frames that are only interrupted by two garerobes.

The best preserved exterior wall is on the southeast side with the main gate made from carefully cut bunter sandstone ashlars to which the drawbridge used to lead. Witnesses thereof are a deep blind niche, which frames the ogival arch of the gateway and used to house the drawbridge, and the still visible roller holes for the chains. Above the portal are two angled coats of arms whose details were probably destroyed by French soldiers in 1794. They used to depict the arms of Frederick of Saarwerden and probably the Archbishopric of Cologne.

In addition there is another drawbridge on the southwest side, which gave access to the castle without having to enter the town. For the support buttresses of this bridge, building material from Jülich Palace was used, a building that had stood on the same spot since 1350.

== Literature ==
- Paul Clemen (ed.): Die Kunstdenkmäler des Kreises Euskirchen. L. Schwann, Düsseldorf 1900 (Die Kunstdenkmäler der Rheinprovinz. Vol. 4, Part. 4), pp. 223–228 (online).
- Harald Herzog: Mauern, Türme und Ruinen. Ein Wanderführer zu Burgen und Schlössern im Kreis Euskirchen. Rheinland-Verlag, Cologne,1990, ISBN 3-7927-1153-2, S. 10–14.
- Dirk Holterman, Harald Herzog: Die Euskirchener Burgenrunde. Radeln zwischen Erft und Eifel. Rau, Düsseldorf, 2000, ISBN 3-7919-0750-6, pp. 98–99 (online).
- Robert Janke, Harald Herzog: Burgen und Schlösser im Rheinland. Greven, Cologne, 2005, ISBN 3-7743-0368-1, p. 67.
