= Naturschutzsee Füssenich =

Lake in Zülpich, Germany

Neffelsee
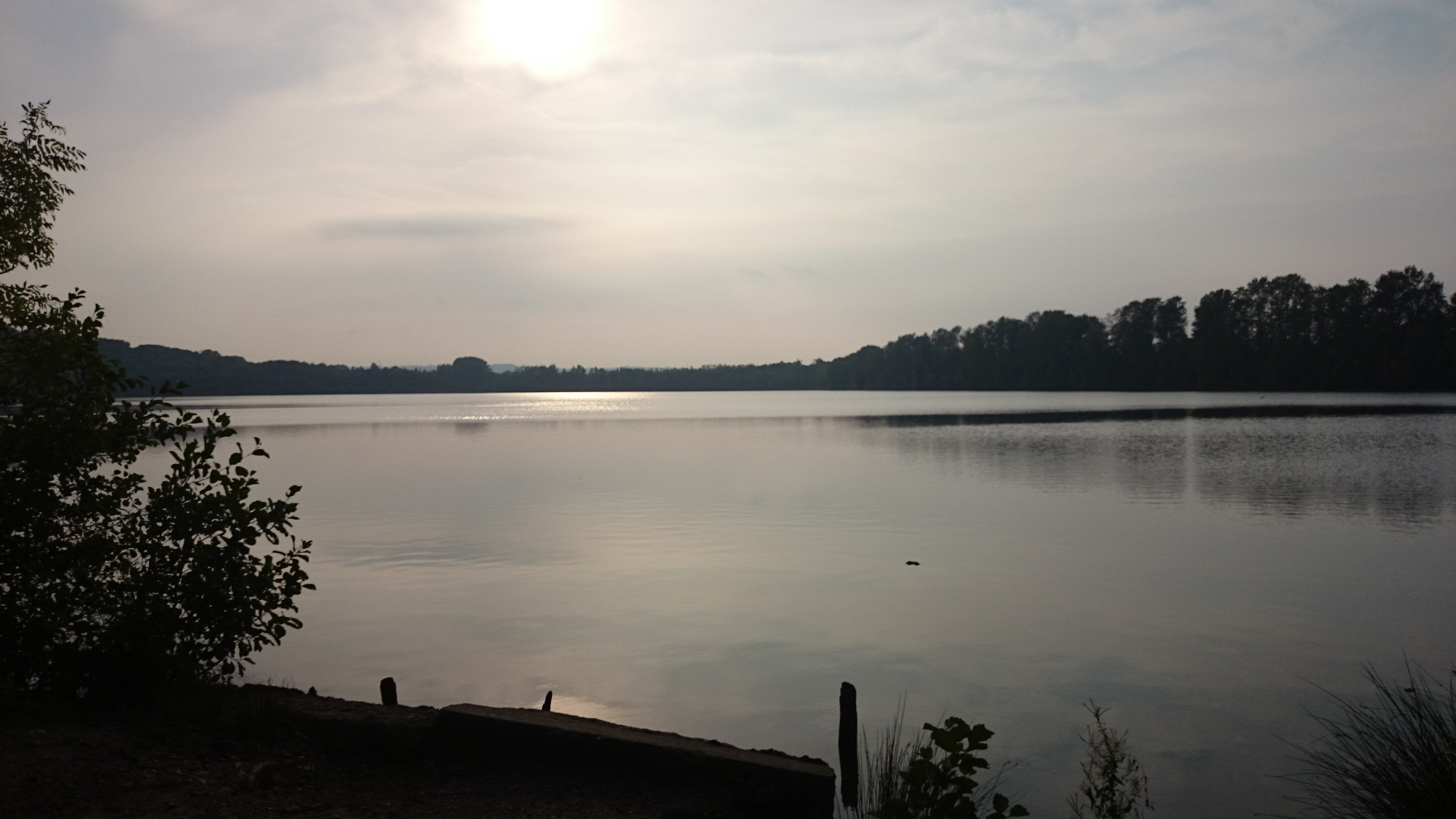

- Location within North Rhine-Westphalia
- Location: Zülpich, North Rhine-Westphalia
- Coordinates: 50°41′50″N 06°37′31″E
- Primary inflows: Neffelbach
- Primary outflows: Neffelbach
- Basin countries: Germany
- Surface area: 65 ha (160 acres)
- Max. depth: 28 m (92 ft)

Neffelsee (also Naturschutzsee Füssenich) is an open-pit mining lake in Zülpich, North Rhine-Westphalia, Germany. It was formed around 1967 by the restoration of the "Zülpich-Mitte" mine. The lake is located in the Neffelsee nature reserve. Originally it was meant to have a bathing beach, this plan was also being discussed at the very similar Zülpich water sports lake, however it failed. This is since the embankments made of sand kept slipping and now the only functions of the lake today are as a nature reserve and a flood retention basin of the Neffelbach.
