= Wassersportsee Zülpich =

Lake in Zülpich, Germany

Zülpicher See
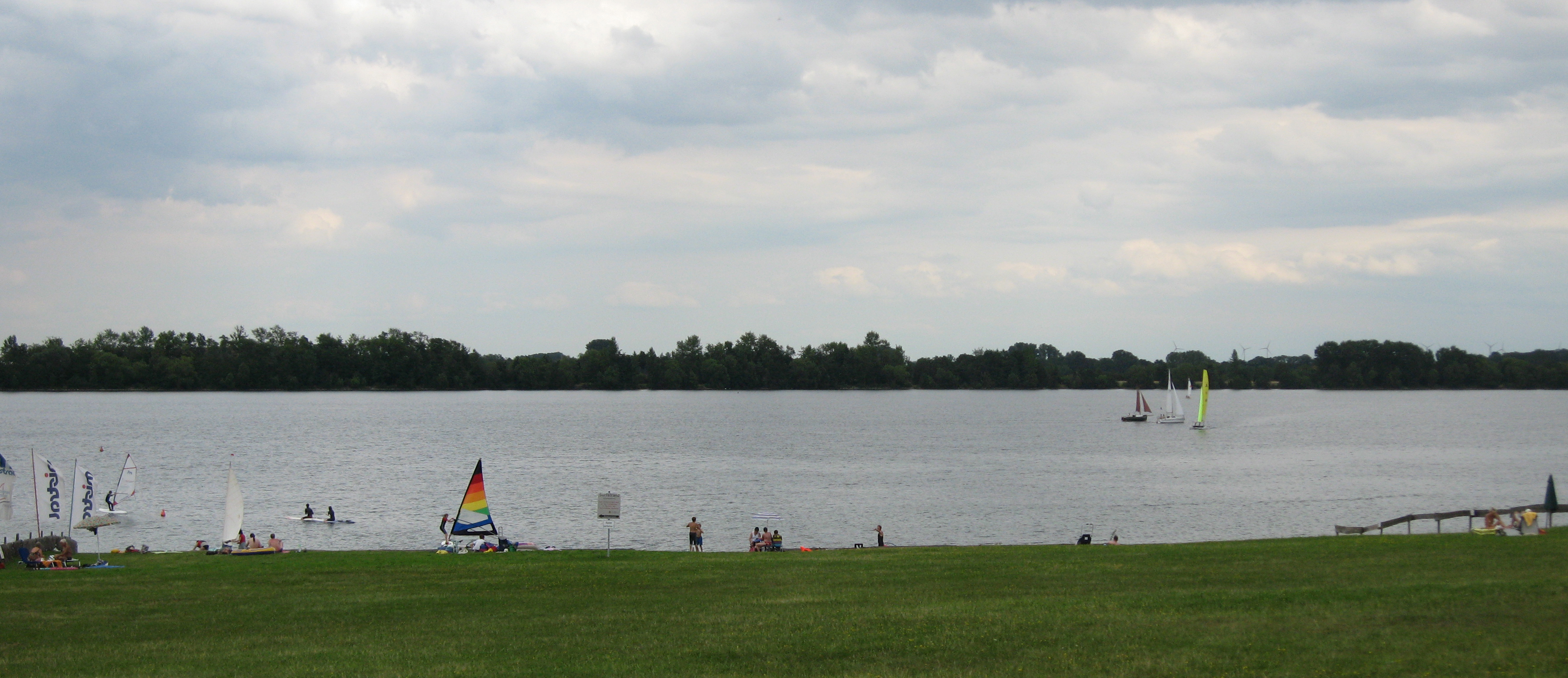

- Location within Germany
- Location: Zülpich, North Rhine-Westphalia
- Coordinates: 50°40′48″N 06°39′53″E
- Primary outflows: none
- Basin countries: Germany
- Max. length: 1,200 m (3,900 ft)
- Max. width: 500 m (1,600 ft)
- Surface area: 85 ha (210 acres)
- Max. depth: 62 m (203 ft)
- Surface elevation: 154 m (505 ft)

Zülpicher See (also Wassersportsee Zülpich) is a lake in Zülpich, North Rhine-Westphalia, Germany. At an elevation of 154 m, its surface area is 85 ha.
