= Zülpich =

Place in North Rhine-Westphalia, Germany

- Town
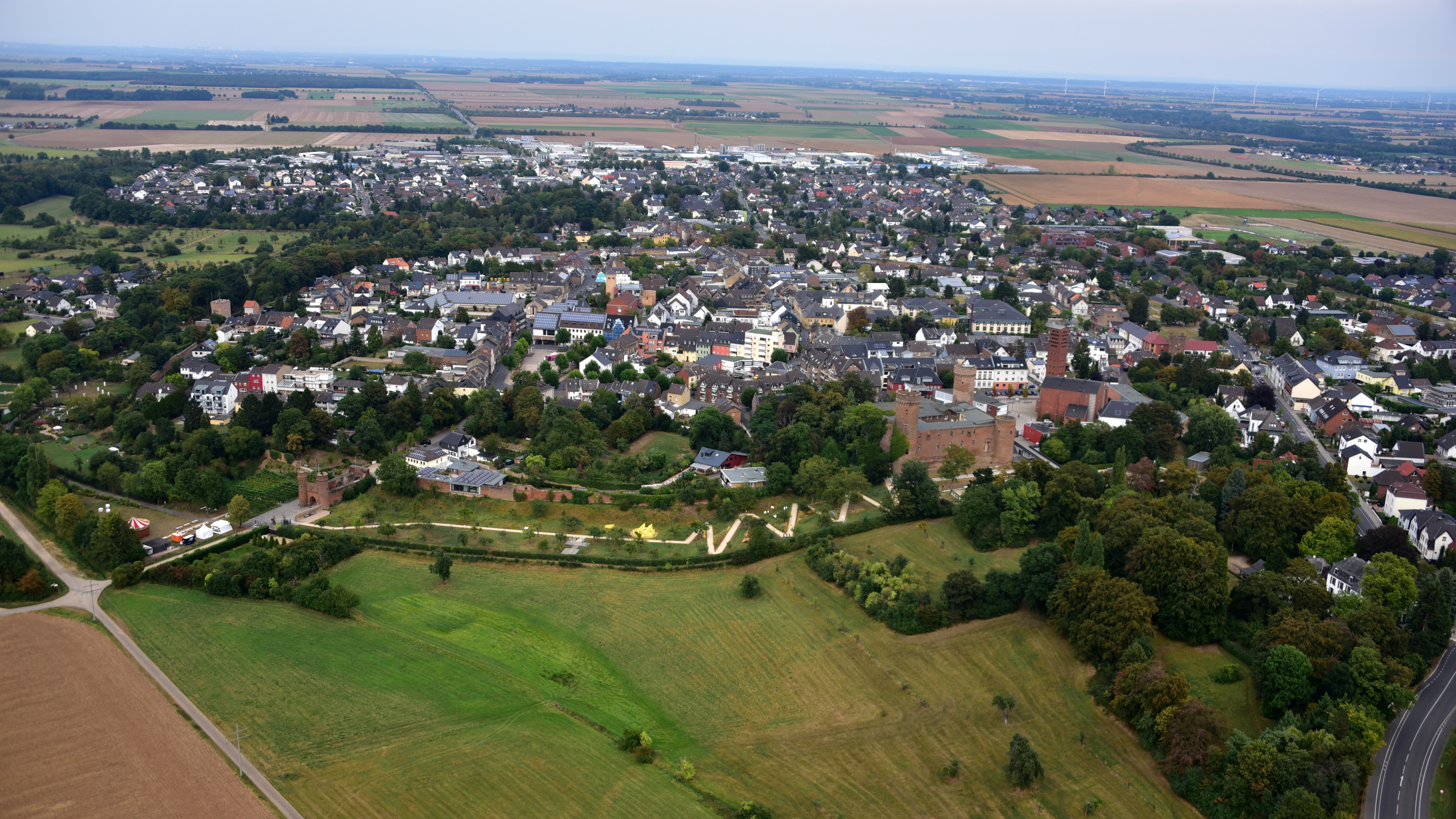

- Flag Coat of arms

- Location of Zülpich within Euskirchen district
- Interactive map of Zülpich
- Location within Germany Location within North Rhine-Westphalia
- Coordinates: 50°42′N 6°39′E
- Country: Germany
- State: North Rhine-Westphalia
- Admin. region: Köln
- District: Euskirchen
- Subdivisions: Kernstadt and 20 villages

Government
  - Mayor: Ulf Hürtgen (CDU)

Area
  - Total: 101.01 km^{2} (39.00 sq mi)
- Elevation: 180 m (590 ft)

Population (2025-12-31)
  - Total: 21,906
  - Density: 216.87/km^{2} (561.69/sq mi)
- Time zone: UTC+01:00 (CET)
  - Summer (DST): UTC+02:00 (CEST)
- Postal codes: 53909
- Dialling codes: 02252
- Vehicle registration: EU
- Website: www.stadt-zuelpich.de

Zülpich (German pronunciation: [ˈtsʏlpɪç]; Kölsch: Zöllech) is a town in North Rhine-Westphalia, Germany between Aachen and Bonn. It belongs to the district of Euskirchen.

== History ==
The town is commonly agreed to be the site with the Latin name of Tolbiacum, famous for the Battle of Tolbiac, fought between the Franks under Clovis I and the Alemanni; the traditional date is 496, corrected in many modern accounts to 506. The battle is commemorated in the names of the Rue de Tolbiac and the Tolbiac Métro station in Paris.

On 1 January 1969, the former municipalities of Bessenich, Dürscheven, Enzen, Langendorf, Linzenich-Lövenich, Merzenich, Nemmenich, Oberelvenich, Rövenich, Sinzenich, Ülpenich, Weiler in der Ebene, and Wichterich were incorporated into the borough of Zülpich. On 1 January 1972, Bürvenich, Füssenich, and Schwerfen (part of Veytal) were added.

== Population ==
Historical population

Year	Pop.	±% p.a.
1965	16,191	—
1970	16,400	+0.26%
1975	16,172	−0.28%
1980	16,535	+0.44%
1985	16,736	+0.24%
1990	17,298	+0.66%
1995	18,878	+1.76%

Year	Pop.	±% p.a.
2000	19,444	+0.59%
2005	20,105	+0.67%
2010	20,005	−0.10%
2015	20,091	+0.09%
2020	20,440	+0.35%
2025	21,906	+1.39%

Source: Landesdatabank Nordrhein-Westfalen

== Sights ==
- Zülpich Castle
- Wassersportsee Zülpich
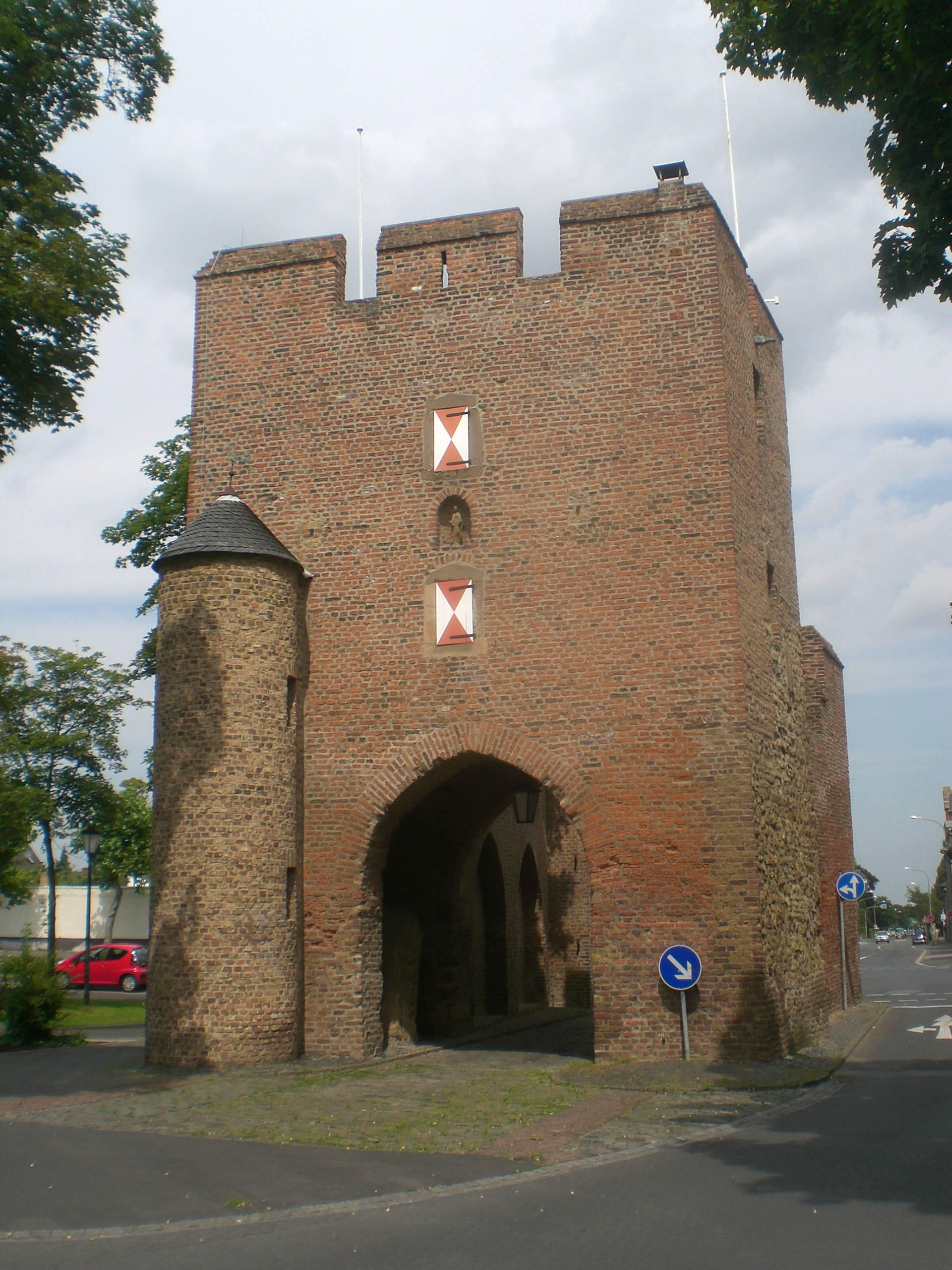
Zülpich's Cologne gate

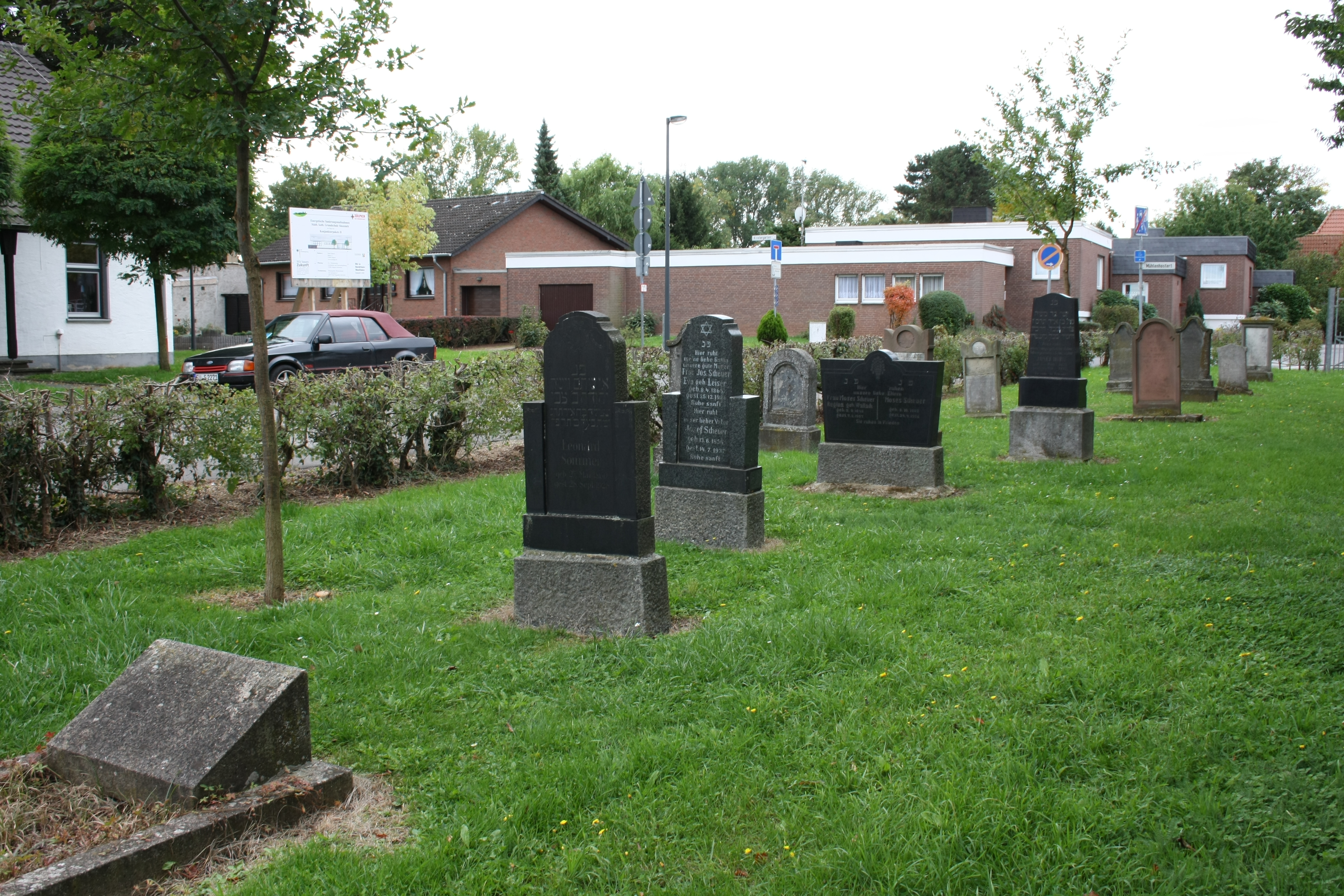
Sinzenich's Jewish cemetery

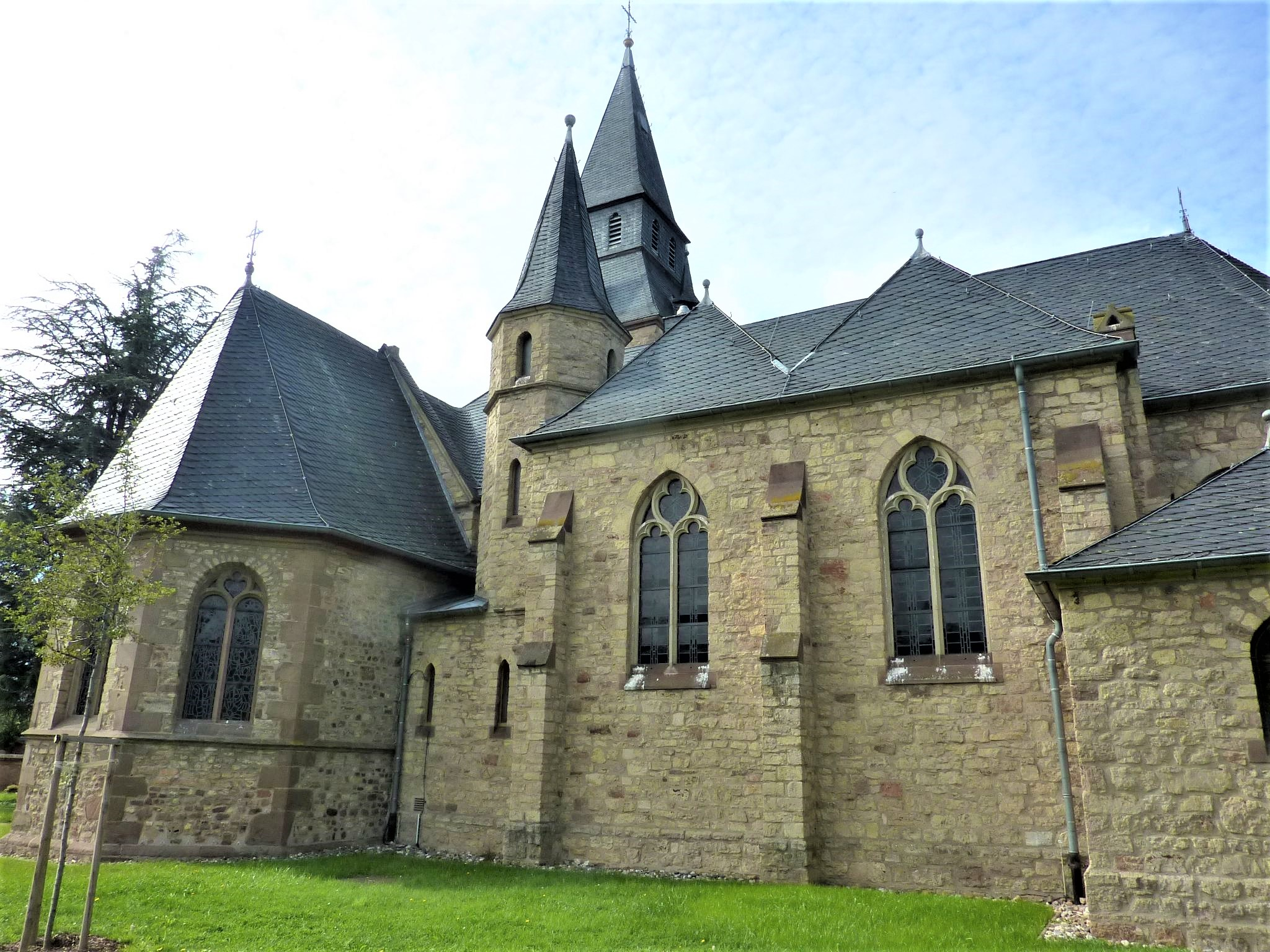
St. Gereon (Dürscheven)

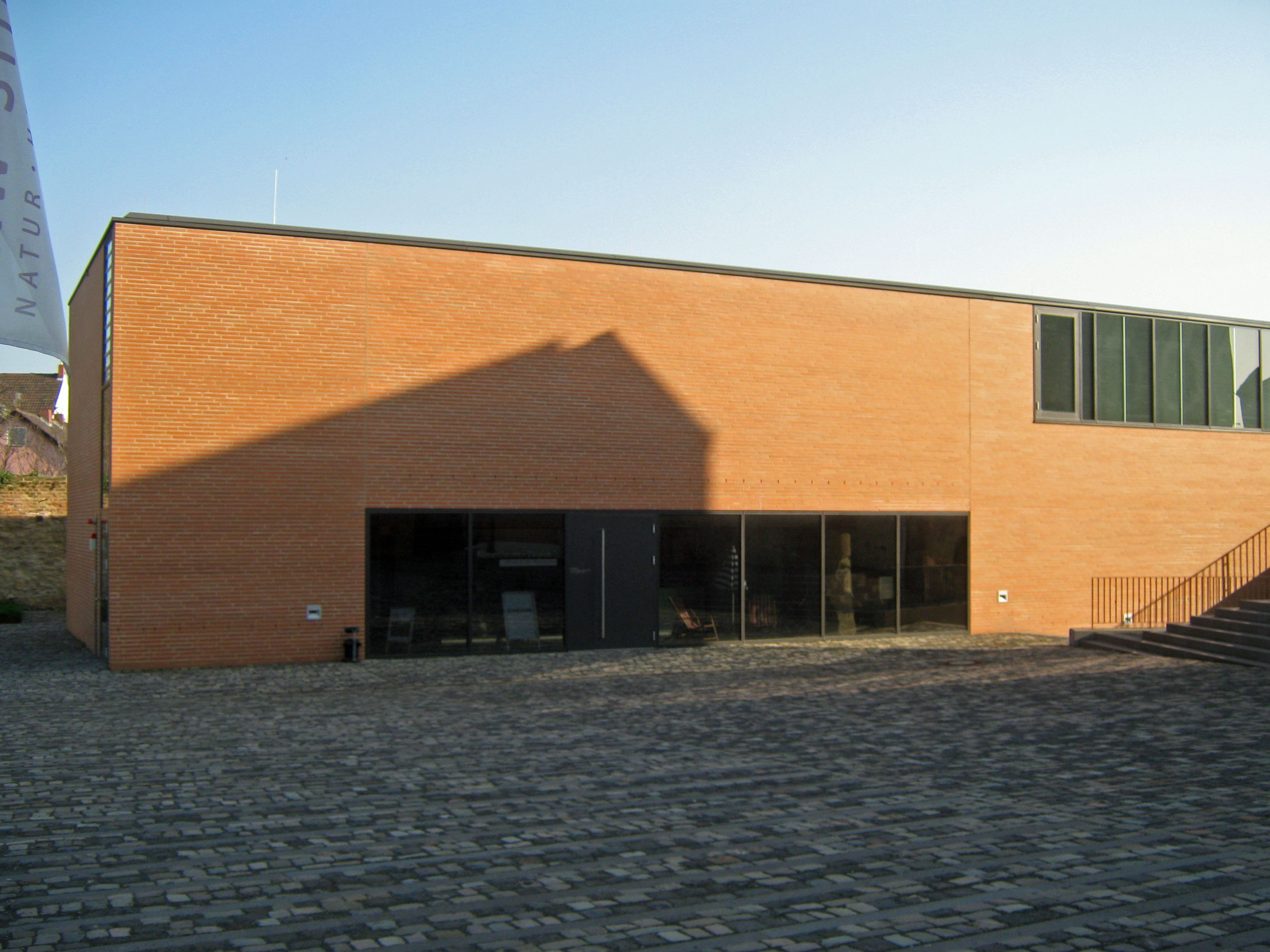
Museum of Bathing Culture

== Twinnings ==
- Blaye, France
- Kangasala, Finland
- Elst, Netherlands

== Notable people ==
- Ferdinand von Hompesch zu Bolheim, (1744-1805), Grand Master of the Order of Malta
- Theodor Weber, (1836-1906), bishop
- Theo Breuer (born 1956), author and editor
- Silke Rottenberg, (born 1972), former national football player, grew up in Zülpich
- Oliver Krischer, (born 1969), biologist and politician (The Greens), Member of Bundestag since 2009, lives in Düren
