= Graeme Pallister =

Scottish chef and restaurateur

- Culinary career
- Current restaurant(s): 63 Tay Street (since 2007; 18 years ago) No.1 The Bank (since 2005; 20 years ago)
- Previous restaurant(s): Kinloch House Hotel; Angel; Longueville Manor; Let's Eat; Restaurant Andrew Fairlie

Graeme Pallister is a Scottish chef and restaurateur from Blairgowrie, Perth and Kinross. He is currently owner and chef patron at 63 Tay Street and chef patron at No.1 The Bank, both in Perth. His cooking career began in 1994 at Kinloch House Hotel. From there, he went on to work at Angel, in Sussex; Longueville Manor, in Jersey; Let's Eat, in Perth; and Restaurant Andrew Fairlie, near Auchterarder. He began at No.1 The Bank in June 2005, and opened 63 Tay Street (now with two AA Rosettes) in January 2007. Ten years later, 63 Tay Street was named "Scottish Restaurant of the Year" at the Scottish Food Awards. On a personal level, he has won Scottish Hotel Awards' "Executive Chef of the Year" (2010) and Catering in Scotland's "Chef of the Year" (2013).

== Early life ==
Pallister grew up in Coupar Angus, Perth and Kinross, one of two sons of a father who was a local policeman and a mother who worked as a secretary at Blairgowrie Golf Club. His maternal grandparents ran the Red House Pub in the town, prior to its conversion into a hotel. He recalls helping out in its kitchen, during a celebration to mark his grandparents' anniversary, and "experiencing a strong feeling of belonging". His father's parents ran hotels on Jersey, where Pallister later worked.

== Career ==
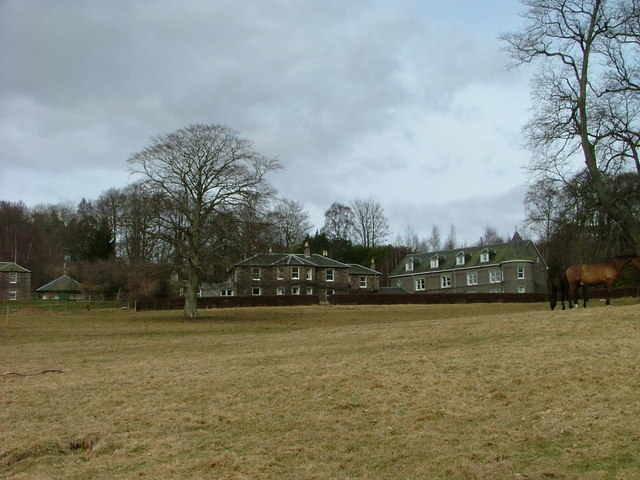
Kinloch House Hotel

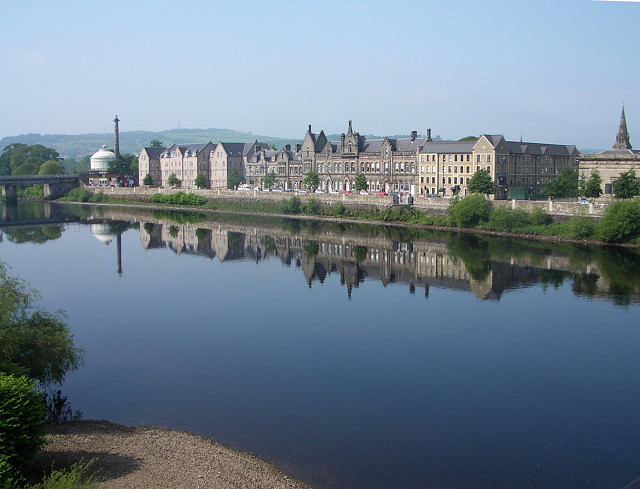
The stretch of properties in the centre, formerly Perth Museum, is home to 63 Tay Street

Pallister began his culinary career at nearby Kinloch House Hotel, under head chef Bill McNicoll, via a Youth Training Scheme (YTS) placement while still studying at Perth College UHI. Its restaurant was three AA Rosettes at the time. He moved out of his parents' home and lived on the property with several other chefs.

After reading White Heat by Marco Pierre White, Pallister decided he wanted to work at a Michelin star restaurant, so he moved to Jersey and, after writing a letter to Andrew Baird, head chef at Longueville Manor, began the next stage of his career. While Baird remains in that role today, Pallister's time on Jersey was short-lived, and he returned to Scotland. He then found a cooking job at Angel, in Sussex, to which he moved at the age of 17.

During a summer break, he returned to the Scottish countryside and picked broccoli on the Strathmore Estate. Shortly thereafter, he wrote a letter to Tony Heath, head chef at Let's Eat, in Perth. Successful in his inquiry, he moved into his first house, on Ballantine Place, just off the Dunkeld Road to the northwest of the city centre. At Let's Eat, he had Sunday and Monday off, but would work around 15 hours each day for the other five.

After Andrew Fairlie opened his eponymous restaurant in Perth, Pallister took to his writing pad once more. Successful, he began working at the Gleneagles Hotel establishment for its opening year of 2001.

Also in the early 2000s, Tony Heath opened Let's Eat Again, on Perth's George Street. He offered Pallister his first head-chef role.

Pallister and his wife moved back to Kinloch House briefly, but in 2005 they got word that a new couple to Perth — Scott and Penny Edwards — were opening a restaurant at the Parklands Hotel. Pallister was successful again in his application, and he walked to his new role through the South Inch every day from their home in the Craigie area of Perth.

In 2007, as Pallister was approaching the age of 30, the property at Perth's 63 Tay Street came on the market. It seemed to Pallister that it provided the perfect stepping stone to the opening of his first restaurant. After connecting with Jim Fairlie, the founder of Perth's farmers' market, he began focusing on using locally sourced ingredients. It won the Scottish Food Awards' Restaurant of the Year in 2017.

Pallister won the Scottish Hotel Awards' "Executive Chef of the Year" award in 2010.

From 2010, over the course of four years, he helped the local Moncreiffe Primary School raise funds for a new kitchen and a garden, working with and informing the teachers, who would then pass on their learning to the school's children. It was called the "MasterChef to Maestros" programme.

In 2013, Pallister was the recipient of Catering in Scotland's "Chef of the Year" award.

The following year, he wrote a paper for the Scottish Government, highlighting the need for nutritional-food education to begin in primary school. It was one of the influences for the government's Chefs at School programme.

Pallister is a member of Slow Food UK's Chef Alliance.

== Personal life ==
Pallister is married to Fiona, whom he first met at high school and, as fate would have it, started as a receptionist at Kinloch while Pallister was working there. He proposed in the car park of the Red Lion pub in Chichester, having purchased the engagement ring from Argos. Four years after the proposal, and a year after moving into their first house, in Perth, the couple married. They had two children between 2003 and 2006.
