= Tom Kitchin =

British chef (born 1977)

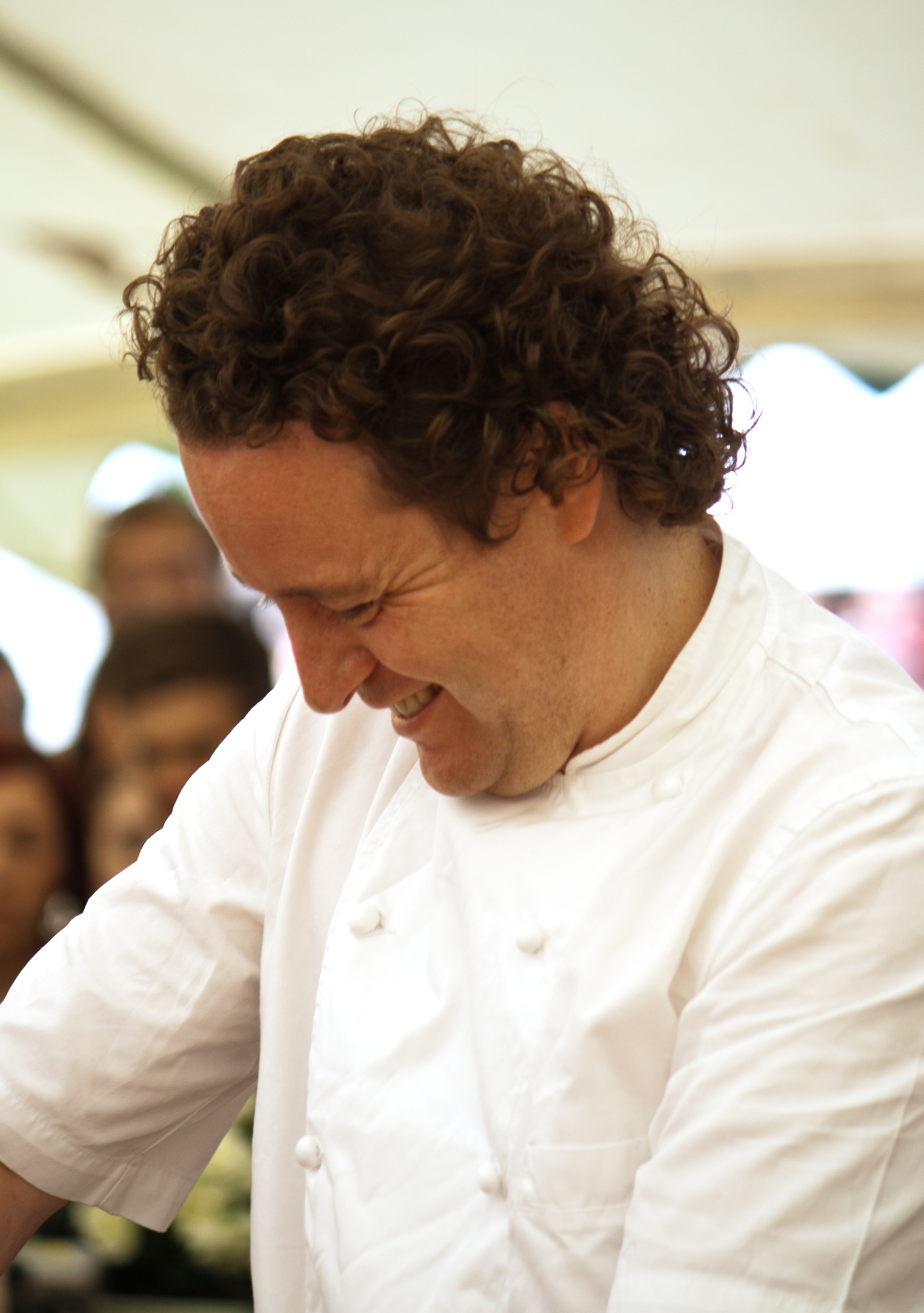
- Kitchin in 2012
- Born: 1977 (age 48–49); Edinburgh, Scotland
- Spouse: Michaela Berselius
- Culinary career
- Cooking style: French cuisine
- Ratings
- Michelin stars; AA Rosettes; Good Food Guide
- Current restaurants
- The Kitchin; Scran & Scallie; The Bonnie Badger
- Website: www.thekitchin.com

Thomas William Kitchin is a Scottish chef and owner of The Kitchin, where he became Scotland's youngest winner of a Michelin star.

Kitchin and his wife Michaela opened The Kitchin in 2006 on Leith’s waterfront. The restaurant was awarded a Michelin Star in 2007, just six months after opening, making Kitchin Scotland’s youngest Michelin star chef proprietor at 29 years old. The restaurant has retained its Michelin star and has been recognised with other awards and accolades. In 2015, The Kitchin became Scotland’s only restaurant to hold 5 AA Rosettes.

Kitchin trained in some of Europe's leading kitchens, including La Tante Claire in London under Pierre Koffmann, and Guy Savoy in Paris, as well as Le Louis XV in Monaco, led by Alain Ducasse.

== Career ==
Born in Edinburgh, Kitchin attended Dollar Academy at in Dollar, Clackmannanshire. After leaving school, he studied catering at Perth College before beginning an apprenticeship at the Gleneagles Hotel, near Auchterarder, Perth and Kinross. He has worked with Pierre Koffmann, Alain Ducasse, and Guy Savoy, all of whom have been awarded three Michelin stars.

At the age of 29, he was awarded his first Michelin star, after The Kitchin had been in business for six months. This made Kitchin the youngest Michelin star recipient in the world. Albert Roux is reported to have said that Kitchin is the chef in Scotland most likely to win three Michelin stars. His cooking style combines French techniques with seasonal Scottish ingredients, a style discussed in his 2010 book From Nature to Plate.

In July 2010, Kitchin opened a second restaurant, Castle Terrace, near Edinburgh Castle with chef Dominic Jack. Jack co-owned and ran the restaurant as a sister restaurant to The Kitchin, using the same style and "From Nature to plate" philosophy. The restaurant was awarded a Michelin star in 2011. The restaurant closed in 2020 as a result of the coronavirus pandemic.

In 2010, Kitchin was voted Observer Food Monthly Cook of the Year.

In June 2012, Kitchin received an Honorary Doctorate of Arts degree from Edinburgh Napier University for his contribution to Scottish food culture.

In 2013, Kitchin and Jack opened the gastropub The Scran & Scallie in the Edinburgh's Stockbridge area.

== Books ==
Kitchin has authored four cookbooks.

- From Nature to Plate: Seasonal Recipes from The Kitchin, published by Weidenfeld & Nicolson, August 2009. The book which launched at the Edinburgh International Book Festival in August 2009. The book offers a fresh seasonal outlook with 100 of Kitchin's favourite recipes, and follows his journey from a young, ambitious trainee in his local country pub to his success as Scotland’s youngest Michelin starred chef proprietor.
- Kitchin Suppers, Quadrille Publishing, January 2012
- Tom Kitchin’s Meat & Game, Absolute Press, August 2017
- Tom Kitchin’s Fish & Shellfish, Absolute Press, August 2018

== Media appearances ==
Kitchin has appeared as a guest presenter BBC’s The One Show as well as having appeared numerous times on Saturday Kitchen Live and MasterChef. Kitchin made brief appearance on Channel 4's Come Dine With Me on 5 December 2016 as a friend of contestant Larah Bross.

In 2019, The Kitchin was featured in the BBC2 series Most Remarkable Places to Eat. He's also competed on the Great British Menu and hosted 2010 MasterChef winner Dhruv Baker for work experience at The Kitchin.

== Awards ==
In 2007, The Kitchin was awarded a Michelin-star and in 2015 it became Scotland’s only restaurant to hold 5 AA Rosettes, both of which the restaurant has held onto every year since. The Kitchin's other awards include:

- The Kitchin, 1 star in the MICHELIN Guide Great Britain & Ireland 2021
- The Kitchin, 5 AA Rosettes, AA Best Restaurants 2021
- The Kitchin, Best Restaurant Outside of London, Food & Travel Awards, 2021
- The Kitchin, Best Fine Dining Restaurant, No 2, UK, Tripadvisor Travellers’ Choice Awards 2021
- The Kitchin, Best Fine Dining Restaurant, No 10, Europe, Tripadvisor Travellers’ Choice Awards 2021
- Tom Kitchin, Chef Award, The Cateys, 2020
- Tom & Michaela Kitchin, Restaurateur of the Year, The National Restaurant Awards, 2019
- Tom Kitchin, Winner of Best Chef Regularly Cooking Game, Eat Game Awards, 2019

== Personal life ==
Kitchin is married to Michaela, and they have four children. Michaela is co-founder and executive director of Kitchin Group. She previously worked with the Savoy Group, and spent nearly three years at the seven-star Burj Al Arab Hotel in Dubai.

Michaela has been instrumental in the design of each restaurant within Kitchin Group, including the group's second restaurant Castle Terrace.

== Community support ==
Since Christmas 2015, Kitchin has been a celebrity supporter of global international development charity, Mary's Meals, which has its headquarters in Scotland, by supporting its annual "One More For Christmas" campaign. As part of this campaign Tom featured in a video showing viewers how to make "The Most Amazing Christmas Dinner", where he demonstrates how to set a place at the virtual dinner table, which provides a year's worth of meals for a child, at a cost of just £12.20 ($19.50 / €14.50). As of December 2016, Mary's Meals provides daily meals in school for 1,187,104 children in 12 developing countries.

== Controversy ==
In January 2020, three of Kitchin's restaurants were failed by hygiene inspectors in less than a year.

In July 2021, Kitchin was accused of taking thousands of pounds of staff tips.

Also, ex-employees alleged occurrences of "bullying, violence and sexual assault" in Kitchins's restaurants. In response, in July 2021, Kitchin suspended two of his staff for "unacceptable behaviour": one chef for allegedly injuring "a woman's arm with a hot tray from an oven"; another staff for physical assault.
