= Sheriff of Auchterarder =

The Sheriff of Auchterarder was historically the office responsible for enforcing law and order in Auchterarder, Scotland and bringing criminals to justice.

== Sheriffs of Auchterarder ==
- Malcolm de Inverpefer (1304–1305)
