= Perth Technical College =

Perth Technical College may refer to:

- the Scotland educational institution which began in 1961, eventually becoming part of UHI Perth
- the Australian educational institution that became part of the Central Institute of Technology
- Old Perth Technical School building in Perth, Western Australia
