= Thomas Finlayson Henderson =

Scottish historian

- Born: 25 May 1844; Lathones, Fife, Scotland
- Died: 25 December 1923 (aged 79); Wraes Farm, Renfrewshire, Scotland
- Other names: T. F. Henderson
- Occupations: Historian; author; editor

Thomas Finlayson Henderson (25 May 1844 – 25 December 1923), often credited as T. F. Henderson, was a Scottish historian, author and editor. Henderson was a prolific author and contributed entries on Scottish figures for the Dictionary of National Biography and Encyclopædia Britannica. He was considered an authority on poet Robert Burns and Mary, Queen of Scots.

== Biography ==
Henderson was born in Lathones, Fife, Scotland in May 1844. He was the second of 11 children born to farmer Archibald Henderson and his wife, Catherine (née Finlayson), both of Kincardine-in-Menteith, a village in Perthshire.

He attended the University of St Andrews and joined the staff of the Encyclopædia Britannica. In 1914, the University of St Andrews awarded him an honorary LL.D.

He was an editor for several anthologies of poetry, including the works of Robert Burns. His work with Burns was praised by The Times, which noted, "For the first time Burns was edited with the care usually reserved for editions of the ancient classics." Henderson was also an editor of later editions of The History of England from the Accession of James the Second, considered the foremost historic work of its era, and Minstrelsy of the Scottish Border.

== Selected bibliography ==
- A Scots Garland: An Anthology of Scottish Vernacular Verse. Edinburgh: Grant McMurray. 1931.
- Scottish Popular Poetry before Burns. London: Methuen & Co. 1913.
- The Ballad in Literature. Cambridge: Cambridge University Press. 1912.
- Sir David Lyndsay and the later Scottish 'Makaris. 1909.
- The Auld Ayrshire of Robert Burns. Philadelphia: G.W. Jacobs & Co. 1907.
- with Francis Watt: Scotland of To-day. London: Methuen & Co. 1907. (2nd edition 1911; 3rd revised edition 1913)
- 'Charlie He's My Darling' and Other Burns'. Edinburgh University Press. 1906.
- Mary, Queen of Scots, Her Environment and Tragedy, a biography. London. 1905.
- James I and VI. Edinburgh: Goupil & Co. 1904.
- Robert Burns. London: Methuen & Co. 1904.
- A Little Book of Scottish Verse. London: Methuen. 1899.
- Scottish Vernacular Literature; a Succinct History. Edinburgh. 1898.
- Burns: Lesser Scottish Verse. 1896.
- Old-world Scotland; Glimpses of its Modes and Manners. London: T.F. Unwin. 1893.
- Casket letters and Mary Queen of Scots. Edinburgh: A. and C. Black. 1890.
