= List of Michelin-starred restaurants in Scotland =

As of the 2026 guide, there are 15 restaurants in Scotland with a Michelin-star rating, a rating system used by the Michelin Guide to grade restaurants based on their quality.

Restaurants in Scotland are reviewed as part of the Michelin Guide Great Britain & Ireland, which updates annually each winter.

== Lists ==
=== 2021–2026 ===
Key
1 Michelin star	One Michelin star
2 Michelin stars	Two Michelin stars
—	The restaurant did not receive a star that year
Closed	The restaurant is no longer open

Michelin-starred restaurants
Name	Cuisine	Location	2021	2022	2023	2024	2025	2026
1887	Scottish	Highland – Torridon	—	—	—	—	—	1 Michelin star
AVERY	Creative	Edinburgh – Stockbridge	—	—	—	—	1 Michelin star	1 Michelin star
Cail Bruich	Scottish	Glasgow – West End	1 Michelin star	1 Michelin star	1 Michelin star	1 Michelin star	1 Michelin star	1 Michelin star
Condita	Contemporary	Edinburgh – Newington	1 Michelin star	1 Michelin star	1 Michelin star	1 Michelin star	1 Michelin star	1 Michelin star
Heron	Contemporary	Edinburgh – Leith	—	—	1 Michelin star	1 Michelin star	1 Michelin star	1 Michelin star
Isle of Eriska	Contemporary	Argyll and Bute – Eriska	1 Michelin star	—	—	—	—	—
Killiecrankie House	Japanese / Scottish	Perth and Kinross – Killiecrankie	—	—	—	—	—	1 Michelin star
Loch Bay	Contemporary	Isle of Skye – Stein	1 Michelin star	1 Michelin star	1 Michelin star	1 Michelin star	1 Michelin star	1 Michelin star
LYLA	Modern British	Edinburgh –	—	—	—	—	1 Michelin star	1 Michelin star
Martin Wishart	Contemporary	Edinburgh – Leith	1 Michelin star	1 Michelin star	1 Michelin star	1 Michelin star	1 Michelin star	1 Michelin star
Number One	British	Edinburgh – Old Town	1 Michelin star	—	—	—	—	—
Restaurant Andrew Fairlie	French	Perth and Kinross – Auchterarder	2 Michelin stars	2 Michelin stars	2 Michelin stars	2 Michelin stars	2 Michelin stars	2 Michelin stars
The Cellar	Contemporary	Fife – Anstruther	1 Michelin star	1 Michelin star	1 Michelin star	Closed		
The Glenturret Lalique	Contemporary	Perth and Kinross – Crieff	—	1 Michelin star	1 Michelin star	2 Michelin stars	2 Michelin stars	2 Michelin stars
The Kitchin	Contemporary	Edinburgh – Leith	1 Michelin star	1 Michelin star	1 Michelin star	1 Michelin star	1 Michelin star	1 Michelin star
The Peat Inn	Contemporary	Fife – Peat Inn	1 Michelin star	1 Michelin star	1 Michelin star	1 Michelin star	1 Michelin star	1 Michelin star
Timberyard	British	Edinburgh – Old Town	—	—	1 Michelin star	1 Michelin star	1 Michelin star	1 Michelin star
Unalome by Graeme Cheevers	British	Glasgow – West End	—	1 Michelin star	1 Michelin star	1 Michelin star	1 Michelin star	1 Michelin star
Reference								

=== 2015–2020 ===
Key
1 Michelin star	One Michelin star
2 Michelin stars	Two Michelin stars
—	The restaurant did not receive a star that year
Closed	The restaurant is no longer open

Michelin-starred restaurants
Name	Cuisine	Location	2015	2016	2017	2018	2019	2020
21212	French	Edinburgh – Old Town	—	1 Michelin star	1 Michelin star	1 Michelin star	1 Michelin star	—
Albannach	Scottish	Highland – Lochinver	1 Michelin star	1 Michelin star	1 Michelin star	1 Michelin star	—	—
Boath House	British	Highland – Nairn	1 Michelin star	1 Michelin star	1 Michelin star	1 Michelin star	—	—
Braidwoods	British	Ayrshire – Dalry	1 Michelin star	1 Michelin star	1 Michelin star	1 Michelin star	1 Michelin star	1 Michelin star
Castle Terrace	British	Edinburgh – Old Town	1 Michelin star	—	—	—	—	Closed
Condita	Contemporary	Edinburgh – Newington	—	—	—	—	—	1 Michelin star
Isle of Eriska	Contemporary	Argyll and Bute – Eriska	1 Michelin star	1 Michelin star	1 Michelin star	—	—	1 Michelin star
Kinloch Lodge	Scottish	Isle of Skye – Sleat	1 Michelin star	1 Michelin star	1 Michelin star	—	—	—
Knockinaam Lodge	French	Dumfries and Galloway – Portpatrick	1 Michelin star	—	—	—	—	—
Loch Bay	Contemporary	Isle of Skye – Stein	—	—	—	1 Michelin star	1 Michelin star	1 Michelin star
Martin Wishart	Contemporary	Edinburgh – Leith	1 Michelin star	1 Michelin star	1 Michelin star	1 Michelin star	1 Michelin star	1 Michelin star
Martin Wishart At Loch Lomond	Contemporary	West Dunbartonshire – Balloch	1 Michelin star	1 Michelin star	Closed			
Number One	British	Edinburgh – Old Town	1 Michelin star	1 Michelin star	1 Michelin star	1 Michelin star	1 Michelin star	1 Michelin star
Restaurant Andrew Fairlie	French	Perth and Kinross – Auchterarder	2 Michelin stars	2 Michelin stars	2 Michelin stars	2 Michelin stars	2 Michelin stars	2 Michelin stars
Sangster's	British	Fife – Elie	1 Michelin star	1 Michelin star	Closed			
The Cellar	Contemporary	Fife – Anstruther	—	1 Michelin star	1 Michelin star	1 Michelin star	1 Michelin star	1 Michelin star
The Kitchin	Contemporary	Edinburgh – Leith	1 Michelin star	1 Michelin star	1 Michelin star	1 Michelin star	1 Michelin star	1 Michelin star
The Peat Inn	Contemporary	Fife – Peat Inn	1 Michelin star	1 Michelin star	1 Michelin star	1 Michelin star	1 Michelin star	1 Michelin star
Three Chimneys	Scottish	Isle of Skye – Colbost	1 Michelin star	—	—	—	—	—
Reference								

== See also ==
- List of Michelin-starred restaurants in England
- List of Michelin starred restaurants in Greater London
- List of Michelin-starred restaurants in Northern Ireland
- List of Michelin-starred restaurants in Wales
- List of Michelin-starred restaurants in Ireland
- List of Michelin 3-star restaurants in the United Kingdom
- Lists of restaurants
