= List of listed buildings in Kilconquhar, Fife =

This is a list of listed buildings in the parish of Kilconquhar in Fife, Scotland.

== List ==
| Name | Location | Date listed | Grid ref. (Note: Sometimes known as OSGB36, the grid reference (where provided) is based on the British national grid reference system used by the Ordnance Survey. • "Guide to National Grid". Ordnance Survey. • "Get-a-map". Ordnance Survey.) | Geo-coordinates | Notes | LB number (Note: Historic Environment Scotland assign a unique alphanumeric identifier to each designated site in Scotland, for listed buildings this always begins with "LB", for example "LB12345".) | Image |
|---|---|---|---|---|---|---|---|
| Colinsburgh, Houses (Summers, Ballantyne And Brown) Main Street, East End | | | | 56°13′14″N 2°50′42″W | Category C(S) | 10795 | Upload Photo |
| Charleton House - Terraces, Steps And Gates South Of The House | | | | 56°13′26″N 2°52′21″W | Category B | 8583 | Upload Photo |
| House (Bayne) Main Street, Colinsburgh | | | | 56°13′14″N 2°50′42″W | Category C(S) | 8591 | Upload Photo |
| House (Balcarres Arms Hotel, Master Of Lindsay's Trust) Main Street, Colinsburgh | | | | 56°13′13″N 2°50′53″W | Category C(S) | 8597 | Upload Photo |
| Cafe Restaurant, Craigdene And Cruachan Together With Garage And Store On East Side Of North Wynd At Rear. Main Street East End Colinsburgh | | | | 56°13′15″N 2°50′46″W | Category C(S) | 8605 | Upload Photo |
| House And Shop (C W Black) Corner Of Main Street And North Wynd, Colinsburgh | | | | 56°13′15″N 2°50′47″W | Category C(S) | 8606 | Upload Photo |
| Craig Cottage Main Street West End | | | | 56°13′13″N 2°50′59″W | Category C(S) | 8613 | Upload Photo |
| Pitcorthie Home Farm - Cottages | | | | 56°13′21″N 2°49′46″W | Category B | 8618 | Upload Photo |
| Auld Robin Gray's Cottage, Cross Roads, South Den Balcarres | | | | 56°13′22″N 2°49′46″W | Category B | 8620 | Upload Photo |
| Balneil Bridge Over Den Burn | | | | 56°14′19″N 2°51′05″W | Category C(S) | 8639 | Upload Photo |
| Lathallan Mill Bridge | | | | 56°14′29″N 2°51′35″W | Category C(S) | 8642 | Upload Photo |
| Mayview, Main Street, And St Andrews Road Kilconquhar | | | | 56°12′32″N 2°49′37″W | Category C(S) | 8514 | Upload Photo |
| Mayview East, Formerly Primrose Brae And Ruinous Cottage Adjoining (Doggartland Estates Ltd) Main Street And St Andrews Road, Kilconquhar | | | | 56°12′32″N 2°49′37″W | Category C(S) | 8515 | Upload Photo |
| Lilac Cottage, Barnyards | | | | 56°12′38″N 2°49′42″W | Category C(S) | 8534 | Upload Photo |
| Archview And Openfields (Marr And Gray) Barnyards | | | | 56°12′37″N 2°49′45″W | Category C(S) | 8540 | Upload Photo |
| Maxwell Cottage Main Street Kilconquhar | | | | 56°12′31″N 2°49′44″W | Category C(S) | 8551 | Upload Photo |
| Windsor Cottage Main Street, Kilconquhar | | | | 56°12′31″N 2°49′43″W | Category B | 8552 | Upload Photo |
| Bruce's Square (Lord Garnock's Property) Barnyards, St Andrews Road, Kilconquhar | | | | 56°12′37″N 2°49′35″W | Category C(S) | 8567 | Upload Photo |
| Outbuildings, Silverdale Barnyards | | | | 56°12′38″N 2°49′39″W | Category C(S) | 8570 | Upload Photo |
| Colinsburgh, 50 Main Street, Galloway Library Including Boundary Walls | | | | 56°13′14″N 2°50′53″W | Category B | 51354 | Upload Photo |
| Fairfield Farmhouse Including Bothy And Outbuildings | | | | 56°13′19″N 2°50′49″W | Category B | 13692 | Upload Photo |
| House (Ella M Munro) Main Street Colinsburgh | | | | 56°13′14″N 2°50′52″W | Category B | 8575 | Upload Photo |
| Charleton House - Entrance Court, Walls Buildings And Gates | | | | 56°13′29″N 2°52′25″W | Category B | 8582 | Upload Photo |
| Charleton - Doocot | | | | 56°13′18″N 2°52′01″W | Category B | 8587 | Upload Photo |
| House (Miss Black) Main Street Colinsburgh | | | | 56°13′14″N 2°50′48″W | Category C(S) | 8607 | Upload Photo |
| Balcarres House Doocot | | | | 56°13′36″N 2°51′11″W | Category B | 8629 | Upload Photo |
| Balcarres Mains Farmhouse | | | | 56°13′44″N 2°50′17″W | Category B | 8632 | Upload Photo |
| Balneil Farmhouse | | | | 56°14′21″N 2°50′58″W | Category B | 8634 | Upload Photo |
| Toftstead (R L Allan) Main Street Kilconquhar | | | | 56°12′31″N 2°49′46″W | Category B | 8492 | Upload Photo |
| Kilconquhar Parish Church, Main Street | | | | 56°12′29″N 2°49′53″W | Category B | 8504 | Upload another image |
| Kilconquhar Old Parish Church (Ruin) Main Street | | | | 56°12′29″N 2°49′51″W | Category B | 8505 | Upload another image |
| Kilconquhar Parish Church Manse, Main Street, West End, Kilconquhar | | | | 56°12′30″N 2°50′03″W | Category B | 8507 | Upload Photo |
| Woodlands Main Street, Kilconquhar | | | | 56°12′30″N 2°49′39″W | Category B | 8526 | Upload Photo |
| Corner House (David Terris) Main Street, Colinsburgh | | | | 56°13′14″N 2°50′46″W | Category C(S) | 8555 | Upload Photo |
| House And Workshop (Mr Christie) St Andrew's Road Kilconquhar | | | | 56°12′33″N 2°49′36″W | Category C(S) | 8566 | Upload Photo |
| Strian And Roseay Barnyards | | | | 56°12′38″N 2°49′41″W | Category C(S) | 8574 | Upload Photo |
| The Old Manse Main Street, West End Colinsburgh | | | | 56°13′14″N 2°50′56″W | Category C(S) | 8578 | Upload Photo |
| Balcarres Arms Hotel, Main Street Colinsburgh | | | | 56°13′13″N 2°50′52″W | Category B | 8596 | Upload Photo |
| Bayview Main Street Colinsburgh Including Outbuildings | | | | 56°13′12″N 2°50′59″W | Category B | 8601 | Upload Photo |
| Neilsten, Main Street, West End Colinsburgh | | | | 56°13′12″N 2°51′03″W | Category C(S) | 8603 | Upload Photo |
| Bayview And Craigview, Main Street, West End, Colinsburgh | | | | 56°13′12″N 2°51′04″W | Category C(S) | 8604 | Upload Photo |
| House And Shop (A R Legg), Main Street, Colinsburgh | | | | 56°13′14″N 2°50′51″W | Category C(S) | 8611 | Upload Photo |
| Balcarres House - Sundial | | | | 56°13′44″N 2°51′01″W | Category A | 8627 | Upload another image |
| House (A A Richardson) Main Street, West End, Colinsburgh | | | | 56°13′13″N 2°50′57″W | Category C(S) | 8635 | Upload Photo |
| Craigmillar, Main Street, West End, Colinsburgh | | | | 56°13′13″N 2°50′57″W | Category C(S) | 8636 | Upload Photo |
| Lathallan Mill | | | | 56°14′27″N 2°51′41″W | Category B | 8640 | Upload Photo |
| Gilston House North Lodge And Gates | | | | 56°22′25″N 2°59′44″W | Category B | 8645 | Upload Photo |
| Cornercroft, Main Street Kilconquhar | | | | 56°12′30″N 2°49′48″W | Category B | 8490 | Upload Photo |
| Commercial Hotel Main Street, West End Kilconquhar | | | | 56°12′31″N 2°49′55″W | Category B | 8510 | Upload Photo |
| Cottages (Miss S Christie And Mrs Ballingal) Lochside, Main Street Kilconquhar | | | | 56°12′29″N 2°49′47″W | Category C(S) | 8517 | Upload Photo |
| Cameron Cottage Main Street, Kilconquhar | | | | 56°12′30″N 2°49′46″W | Category C(S) | 8519 | Upload Photo |
| Loch Side, Main Street, Kilconquhar | | | | 56°12′30″N 2°49′44″W | Category C(S) | 8521 | Upload Photo |
| Laigh Cottage, Main Street, Kilconquhar | | | | 56°12′30″N 2°49′42″W | Category B | 8524 | Upload Photo |
| Craigard, Barnyards Including Garden Walls | | | | 56°12′39″N 2°49′51″W | Category C(S) | 8542 | Upload Photo |
| Kilconquhar House Old Lodge (Or Old Cottage) At Barnyards | | | | 56°12′38″N 2°49′34″W | Category B | 8543 | Upload Photo |
| Rosemary Cottage Main Street Kilconquhar | | | | 56°12′31″N 2°49′42″W | Category B | 8553 | Upload Photo |
| South View And Honor Oak, Main Street And South Wynd Colinsburgh | | | | 56°13′14″N 2°50′47″W | Category C(S) | 8556 | Upload Photo |
| Gilston House, East Gates | | | | 56°14′58″N 2°53′04″W | Category C(S) | 13013 | Upload Photo |
| Balgonar And Adjoining House (M T R Wilson) Main Street East End, Colinsburgh | | | | 56°13′15″N 2°50′40″W | Category C(S) | 8590 | Upload Photo |
| Flockhouse, Main Street, Colinsburgh | | | | 56°13′14″N 2°50′44″W | Category C(S) | 8593 | Upload Photo |
| Carvenom House Main Street Colinsburgh | | | | 56°13′13″N 2°50′57″W | Category B | 8599 | Upload Photo |
| Allandale (P Ritchie) Main Street Colinsburgh (Including Garage) | | | | 56°13′13″N 2°50′58″W | Category C(S) | 8600 | Upload Photo |
| Gateside Cottage And Craiglea Main Street, West End, Colinsburgh | | | | 56°13′12″N 2°51′02″W | Category C(S) | 8602 | Upload Photo |
| Fairfield - Granary | | | | 56°13′18″N 2°50′48″W | Category B | 8615 | Upload Photo |
| Mayfield South Wynd | | | | 56°13′08″N 2°50′37″W | Category C(S) | 8616 | Upload Photo |
| Cairnie House | | | | 56°13′13″N 2°50′01″W | Category B | 8619 | Upload Photo |
| Balcarres House Terraced Gardens | | | | 56°13′45″N 2°50′58″W | Category B | 8626 | Upload Photo |
| Mrs Agnes Mathers Main Street, West End Colinsburgh | | | | 56°13′13″N 2°50′58″W | Category C(S) | 8637 | Upload Photo |
| Lathallan Mill House And Outbuildings | | | | 56°14′26″N 2°51′44″W | Category C(S) | 8641 | Upload Photo |
| West End (Formerly West End Cottages) Largo Road Largoward | | | | 56°15′17″N 2°51′58″W | Category B | 8643 | Upload Photo |
| Durham Cottage And Royal Bank Office Durham Place Largoward | | | | 56°15′22″N 2°51′48″W | Category B | 8644 | Upload Photo |
| Sandra Cottage Main Street Kilconquhar | | | | 56°12′30″N 2°49′47″W | Category C(S) | 8491 | Upload Photo |
| Kirkside And Adjoining Deserted Cottages (Doggartland Estates Ltd) The Tannery Off Main Street Kilconquhar | | | | 56°12′28″N 2°49′48″W | Category C(S) | 8516 | Upload Photo |
| Adam Court Main Street, Kilconquhar | | | | 56°12′31″N 2°49′36″W | Category C(S) | 8527 | Upload Photo |
| Jasmine Cottage Barnyards | | | | 56°12′38″N 2°49′45″W | Category B | 8536 | Upload Photo |
| Oswald Buildings And House (Miss Smart) Barnyards | | | | 56°12′37″N 2°49′47″W | Category C(S) | 8538 | Upload Photo |
| Kilconquhar House Doocot | | | | 56°12′57″N 2°49′15″W | Category B | 8546 | Upload another image |
| House (D M Fraser) Main Street, Colinsburgh | | | | 56°13′14″N 2°50′48″W | Category C(S) | 8557 | Upload Photo |
| House (Mrs Barclay) Main Street, Colinsburgh | | | | 56°13′14″N 2°50′50″W | Category C(S) | 8561 | Upload Photo |
| House (G T Johnson) Barnyards | | | | 56°12′39″N 2°49′39″W | Category C(S) | 8571 | Upload Photo |
| Lindsay Hall, Barnyards | | | | 56°12′39″N 2°49′39″W | Category B | 8572 | Upload Photo |
| Hall House (Alexander) And Sawmill At Lindsay Hall, Barnyards | | | | 56°12′38″N 2°49′43″W | Category C(S) | 8573 | Upload Photo |
| The Cottage And Attached Office Building, Main Street, Colinsburgh | | | | 56°13′14″N 2°50′54″W | Category B | 8576 | Upload Photo |
| Enfield, Main Street, Colinsburgh | | | | 56°13′11″N 2°50′43″W | Category C(S) | 8592 | Upload Photo |
| House (G W W Dunsire) Main Street Colinsburgh | | | | 56°13′13″N 2°50′53″W | Category C(S) | 8598 | Upload Photo |
| Gordon House Main Street Colinsburgh | | | | 56°13′14″N 2°50′50″W | Category C(S) | 8610 | Upload Photo |
| Balcarres Mill Bridge Over Den Burn | | | | 56°13′21″N 2°49′47″W | Category B | 8621 | Upload Photo |
| Balcarres South Lodge Gates | | | | 56°13′17″N 2°50′20″W | Category B | 8624 | Upload Photo |
| Balcarres North Lodge And Gates | | | | 56°14′19″N 2°50′50″W | Category B | 8633 | Upload Photo |
| Konkers (Miss Wimbush) Main Street, Kilconquhar | | | | 56°12′31″N 2°49′35″W | Category C(S) | 8528 | Upload Photo |
| Kellie Cottage, Garage And Outbuildings, Barnyards | | | | 56°12′38″N 2°49′45″W | Category C(S) | 8537 | Upload Photo |
| Royal Bank Of Scotland, Main Street, Colinsburgh | | | | 56°13′13″N 2°50′49″W | Category C(S) | 8559 | Upload Photo |
| Kithrig, Barnyards, St Andrews Road Kilconquhar | | | | 56°12′38″N 2°49′36″W | Category C(S) | 8568 | Upload Photo |
| Charleton House - Fountain East Of House | | | | 56°13′29″N 2°52′21″W | Category C(S) | 8584 | Upload Photo |
| Kingarth Cottage Main Street, East End Colinsburgh | | | | 56°13′15″N 2°50′38″W | Category B | 8589 | Upload Photo |
| Fairfield - Barn | | | | 56°13′19″N 2°50′49″W | Category B | 8614 | Upload Photo |
| Pitcorthie Home Farm - Farmhouse And Adjoining Section Of Steading | | | | 56°13′19″N 2°49′44″W | Category B | 8617 | Upload Photo |
| Balcarres Estate Office | | | | 56°13′18″N 2°50′12″W | Category B | 8622 | Upload Photo |
| Balcarres House, Including Outbuildings Dower House And Front Entrance Gates | | | | 56°13′45″N 2°50′59″W | Category A | 8625 | Upload Photo |
| Kilconquhar Parish Churchyard, Main Street | | | | 56°12′30″N 2°49′52″W | Category C(S) | 8506 | Upload Photo |
| Ivydene And Shop Main Street, Kilconquhar | | | | 56°12′31″N 2°49′51″W | Category C(S) | 8512 | Upload Photo |
| Kilconquhar Parish School Main Street Kilconquhar | | | | 56°12′31″N 2°49′49″W | Category C(S) | 8513 | Upload Photo |
| Loch House, Main Street, Kilconquhar | | | | 56°12′30″N 2°49′43″W | Category C(S) | 8522 | Upload Photo |
| Knox House (Or Cottage) Main Street, Kilconquhar | | | | 56°12′30″N 2°49′43″W | Category B | 8523 | Upload Photo |
| Allan Cottage, Main Street, Kilconquhar | | | | 56°12′30″N 2°49′41″W | Category C(S) | 8525 | Upload Photo |
| Balclevie (Mrs Forgie) Main Street Kilconquhar | | | | 56°12′31″N 2°49′34″W | Category C(S) | 8529 | Upload Photo |
| Loch Farm | | | | 56°12′31″N 2°49′31″W | Category C(S) | 8531 | Upload Photo |
| Rowanlea (Mr Mackae) East End | | | | 56°12′32″N 2°49′33″W | Category C(S) | 8532 | Upload Photo |
| Belmont (Mr Sutherland) East End | | | | 56°12′32″N 2°49′34″W | Category C(S) | 8533 | Upload Photo |
| Old Post House Main Street Kilconquhar | | | | 56°12′31″N 2°49′45″W | Category B | 8549 | Upload Photo |
| House (Robert Mitchell) Main Street, Colinsburgh | | | | 56°13′14″N 2°50′51″W | Category C(S) | 8562 | Upload Photo |
| Smithy House, St Andrews Road Kilconquhar | | | | 56°12′33″N 2°49′34″W | Category C(S) | 8565 | Upload Photo |
| Invercraig, Main Street, Colinsburgh | | | | 56°13′13″N 2°50′59″W | Category C(S) | 13691 | Upload Photo |
| House And Office (A & A Roger) Main Street, West End, Colinsburgh | | | | 56°13′14″N 2°50′55″W | Category B | 8577 | Upload Photo |
| Kilconquhar Mill Farmhouse | | | | 56°12′45″N 2°50′12″W | Category B | 8579 | Upload Photo |
| Charleton - East Gatepiers | | | | 56°13′24″N 2°51′51″W | Category B | 8588 | Upload Photo |
| House (Grace Bremner) Main Street Colinsburgh | | | | 56°13′14″N 2°50′51″W | Category B | 8612 | Upload Photo |
| Balcarres South Lodge | | | | 56°13′18″N 2°50′21″W | Category B | 8623 | Upload Photo |
| Balcarres House, The Joiner's House | | | | 56°13′54″N 2°51′01″W | Category C(S) | 8631 | Upload Photo |
| House (Margaret O'Keefe) Main Street West End Colinsburgh | | | | 56°13′13″N 2°50′58″W | Category C(S) | 8638 | Upload Photo |
| Falfield Farm House | | | | 56°16′07″N 2°53′51″W | Category B | 8647 | Upload Photo |
| St Anne's Main Street Kilconquhar | | | | 56°12′31″N 2°49′48″W | Category C(S) | 8489 | Upload Photo |
| Bell House, Main Street Kilconquhar | | | | 56°12′30″N 2°49′45″W | Category B | 8520 | Upload Photo |
| House (Miss Smith) And Outbuildings, Barnyards | | | | 56°12′38″N 2°49′43″W | Category C(S) | 8539 | Upload Photo |
| The Old Schoolhouse Including Garden Walls, Barnyards | | | | 56°12′39″N 2°49′50″W | Category B | 8541 | Upload Photo |
| Kilconquhar House South Entrance Gates And Lodge | | | | 56°12′42″N 2°49′34″W | Category B | 8544 | Upload Photo |
| Kilconquhar House North Entrance Gates | | | | 56°13′02″N 2°49′38″W | Category B | 8547 | Upload Photo |
| St Margaret's Main Street, Kilconquhar | | | | 56°12′31″N 2°49′42″W | Category B | 8554 | Upload Photo |
| House (John Easson) Main Street Colinsburgh | | | | 56°13′14″N 2°50′49″W | Category C(S) | 8560 | Upload Photo |
| House (Foster) Main Street Colinsburgh | | | | 56°13′13″N 2°50′51″W | Category C(S) | 8563 | Upload Photo |
| Kilconquhar Parish Young Men's Club, St Andrew's Road Kilconquhar | | | | 56°12′33″N 2°49′35″W | Category C(S) | 8564 | Upload Photo |
| Silverdale Barnyards | | | | 56°12′38″N 2°49′39″W | Category B | 8569 | Upload Photo |
| St Ford Farmhouse | | | | 56°12′04″N 2°50′15″W | Category B | 8580 | Upload Photo |
| Charleton House | | | | 56°13′28″N 2°52′23″W | Category A | 8581 | Upload Photo |
| Charleton House - Wellhead In East Garden | | | | 56°13′29″N 2°52′19″W | Category C(S) | 8585 | Upload Photo |
| Charleton House - Ice House | | | | 56°13′32″N 2°52′13″W | Category C(S) | 8586 | Upload Photo |
| Rhemor, Main Street, Colinsburgh | | | | 56°13′14″N 2°50′45″W | Category C(S) | 8594 | Upload Photo |
| House (Formerly Dingwall, Reps Of Elizabeth Roger) Main Street, Colinsburgh | | | | 56°13′14″N 2°50′46″W | Category C(S) | 8595 | Upload Photo |
| Commercial Inn, Main Street, Colinsburgh | | | | 56°13′15″N 2°50′49″W | Category C(S) | 8608 | Upload Photo |
| House (Miss E P Ramsay And A G Reekie) Main Street Colinsburgh | | | | 56°13′15″N 2°50′49″W | Category C(S) | 8609 | Upload Photo |
| Balcarres House - Folly On Balcarres Craig | | | | 56°13′49″N 2°50′37″W | Category B | 8630 | Upload Photo |
| Largoward Parish Church | | | | 56°15′32″N 2°51′30″W | Category B | 8646 | Upload another image |
| Manse Cottage And Remaining Part Of Manse Offices Main Street West End Kilconquhar | | | | 56°12′30″N 2°49′58″W | Category C(S) | 8508 | Upload Photo |
| May Cottage, Main Street West End Kilconquhar | | | | 56°12′30″N 2°49′57″W | Category C(S) | 8509 | Upload Photo |
| Cottages (Dawson) Main Street Kilconquhar | | | | 56°12′30″N 2°49′46″W | Category C(S) | 8518 | Upload Photo |
| Loch Farmhouses (Archer And Mac Rae) | | | | 56°12′31″N 2°49′31″W | Category C(S) | 8530 | Upload Photo |
| Cottage (G T Johnson) Barnyards | | | | 56°12′38″N 2°49′42″W | Category C(S) | 8535 | Upload Photo |
| Kilconquhar House | | | | 56°12′51″N 2°49′08″W | Category C(S) | 8545 | Upload another image |
| Kilconquhar Mains Farmhouse | | | | 56°12′58″N 2°49′33″W | Category C(S) | 8548 | Upload Photo |
| Bruce's Cottage Main Street Kilconquhar | | | | 56°12′31″N 2°49′45″W | Category B | 8550 | Upload Photo |
| Colinsburgh Parish Church, Main Street, Colinsburgh | | | | 56°13′13″N 2°50′48″W | Category C(S) | 8558 | Upload another image |
| Pitcorthie House Including Goodall Cottage, Garden Walls and Outbuilding, Colinsburgh, Leven | | | | 56°13′35″N 2°49′37″W | Category A | 52177 | Upload Photo |

== Key ==
The scheme for classifying buildings in Scotland is:

- Category A: "buildings of national or international importance, either architectural or historic; or fine, little-altered examples of some particular period, style or building type."
- Category B: "buildings of regional or more than local importance; or major examples of some particular period, style or building type, which may have been altered."
- Category C: "buildings of local importance; lesser examples of any period, style, or building type, as originally constructed or moderately altered; and simple traditional buildings which group well with other listed buildings."

In March 2016 there were 47,288 listed buildings in Scotland. Of these, 8% were Category A, and 50% were Category B, with the remaining 42% being Category C.

== See also ==
- List of listed buildings in Fife
