= List of listed buildings in Cameron, Fife =

This is a list of listed buildings in the parish of Cameron in Fife, Scotland.

== List ==
Name	Location	Date listed	Grid ref. (Note: Sometimes known as OSGB36, the grid reference (where provided) is based on the British national grid reference system used by the Ordnance Survey. • "Guide to National Grid". Ordnance Survey. • "Get-a-map". Ordnance Survey.)	Geo-coordinates	Notes	LB number (Note: Historic Environment Scotland assign a unique alphanumeric identifier to each designated site in Scotland, for listed buildings this always begins with "LB", for example "LB12345".)	Image
Peat Inn Braeside Cottages				56°16′30″N 2°53′09″W	Category B	6711	Upload Photo
Prior Letham Farmhouse				56°18′14″N 2°48′50″W	Category C(S)	2668	Upload another image
Prior Letham Smithy				56°18′23″N 2°49′29″W	Category C(S)	2670	Upload Photo
Cameron Farm Cottages				56°17′40″N 2°51′13″W	Category C(S)	2683	Upload Photo
Kinaldy Farm Cottages				56°17′07″N 2°47′53″W	Category C(S)	2703	Upload Photo
Lathockar Farm Cottage And Store				56°17′19″N 2°49′15″W	Category C(S)	2706	Upload Photo
Cameron Parish Church				56°17′40″N 2°50′04″W	Category B	142	Upload another image
Greigston House Dovecot				56°17′18″N 2°53′44″W	Category C(S)	145	Upload Photo
Peat Inn Old Police Station				56°16′34″N 2°53′05″W	Category C(S)	2666	Upload Photo
Greigston House East End Of West Range Of Steading				56°17′21″N 2°53′37″W	Category C(S)	2697	Upload Photo
Craigtoun Park Island Buildings				56°19′00″N 2°50′22″W	Category C(S)	2646	Upload another image
Denork Cottage				56°18′50″N 2°53′01″W	Category C(S)	2652	Upload Photo
Feddinch House				56°18′39″N 2°50′02″W	Category C(S)	144	Upload Photo
Melville Home Farm Cottage				56°19′11″N 2°50′17″W	Category C(S)	2665	Upload Photo
Bridgetoun Bridge				56°17′53″N 2°47′24″W	Category B	2676	Upload Photo
Cameron School And Schoolhouse, Now Student Voluntary Service Building				56°17′35″N 2°49′50″W	Category C(S)	2681	Upload Photo
Carngour Farmhouse				56°18′13″N 2°46′38″W	Category B	2684	Upload Photo
Carngour Steading				56°18′14″N 2°46′33″W	Category C(S)	2685	Upload Photo
Kinaldy House Dovecot				56°17′03″N 2°47′31″W	Category B	2702	Upload another image
Craigtoun Hospital				56°19′09″N 2°50′31″W	Category B	2644	Upload another image
Craigtoun Park Gatepiers On Cypress Avenue				56°19′06″N 2°50′26″W	Category B	2647	Upload another image
Cameron Farmhouse				56°17′39″N 2°51′04″W	Category B	143	Upload Photo
Mount Melville House, Former Stables				56°19′21″N 2°50′14″W	Category B	4335	Upload another image
Denork House				56°18′50″N 2°53′02″W	Category B	2653	Upload Photo
Peat Inn				56°16′42″N 2°53′05″W	Category C(S)	2667	Upload another image
Cameron Parish Churchyard				56°17′39″N 2°50′04″W	Category B	2677	Upload Photo
Cameron House				56°17′42″N 2°50′03″W	Category C(S)	2678	Upload Photo
Cameron House (Walled Garden)				56°17′41″N 2°50′04″W	Category C(S)	2679	Upload Photo
Cottages At Kinaldy House Offices				56°17′00″N 2°47′34″W	Category C(S)	2701	Upload Photo
Kinaldy Farmhouse And Steading				56°17′10″N 2°47′53″W	Category B	6710	Upload Photo
Prior Letham Steading (Modern Additions Excluded)				56°18′15″N 2°48′49″W	Category C(S)	2669	Upload Photo
Drumcarro Steading				56°18′19″N 2°53′09″W	Category B	2692	Upload Photo
Drumhead Farmhouse Peat Inn				56°16′48″N 2°52′54″W	Category B	2693	Upload Photo
Kinaldy House				56°17′02″N 2°47′22″W	Category B	2699	Upload Photo
Kinaldy House Offices (Front Section Only)				56°17′00″N 2°47′33″W	Category C(S)	2700	Upload Photo
Lathockar Steading				56°17′20″N 2°49′15″W	Category C(S)	2705	Upload Photo
Craigtoun Park Archway At North End Of Cypress Avenue				56°19′06″N 2°50′27″W	Category B	2648	Upload Photo
Craigtoun Park Walled Garden (Former Orchard)				56°19′02″N 2°50′15″W	Category C(S)	2650	Upload another image
Craigtoun Park Formal Garden				56°19′09″N 2°50′20″W	Category B	139	Upload another image
Denork House Cottage At Offices				56°18′48″N 2°52′51″W	Category C(S)	2655	Upload Photo
Lathockar Mains Farmhouse				56°16′29″N 2°49′38″W	Category C(S)	2663	Upload Photo
Mount Melville Home Farm Steading				56°19′11″N 2°50′15″W	Category B	2664	Upload Photo
Winthank Farmhouse				56°18′30″N 2°50′43″W	Category C(S)	2671	Upload Photo
Cameron Steading (Old Part Only)				56°17′40″N 2°51′07″W	Category C(S)	2682	Upload Photo
Denork House Offices				56°18′48″N 2°52′51″W	Category C(S)	2690	Upload Photo
Feddinch Mains Farmhouse				56°18′53″N 2°49′40″W	Category B	2695	Upload Photo
Feddinch Mains Farm Cottages				56°18′51″N 2°49′21″W	Category C(S)	2696	Upload Photo
Carngour Farm Cottages				56°18′14″N 2°46′30″W	Category C(S)	2641	Upload Photo
Craigtoun Hospital Sundial				56°19′09″N 2°50′32″W	Category B	2645	Upload Photo
Cameron Manse				56°17′42″N 2°50′06″W	Category C(S)	2680	Upload Photo
Lathockar Farmhouse				56°17′19″N 2°49′17″W	Category C(S)	2704	Upload Photo
Craigtoun Park Italian Wellhead On Cypress Avenue				56°19′04″N 2°50′23″W	Category C(S)	2649	Upload another image
Craigtoun Park Cottage At Walled Garden				56°19′03″N 2°50′13″W	Category B	2651	Upload another image
Mount Melville Home Farm Dovecot				56°19′13″N 2°50′22″W	Category C(S)	141	Upload Photo
Greigston House				56°17′21″N 2°53′40″W	Category B	6709	Upload Photo
Denork House Walled Garden At Offices				56°18′48″N 2°52′52″W	Category C(S)	2654	Upload Photo
Drumcarro Farmhouse				56°18′18″N 2°53′05″W	Category C(S)	2691	Upload Photo
Hazel Cottage				56°17′27″N 2°49′47″W	Category C(S)	2698	Upload Photo
Cassindonald Farmhouse				56°17′58″N 2°52′00″W	Category B	2642	Upload Photo
Cassindonald Steading (Excluding Modern Buildings On West)				56°17′56″N 2°52′02″W	Category C(S)	2643	Upload Photo

== Key ==
The scheme for classifying buildings in Scotland is:

- Category A: "buildings of national or international importance, either architectural or historic; or fine, little-altered examples of some particular period, style or building type."
- Category B: "buildings of regional or more than local importance; or major examples of some particular period, style or building type, which may have been altered."
- Category C: "buildings of local importance; lesser examples of any period, style, or building type, as originally constructed or moderately altered; and simple traditional buildings which group well with other listed buildings."

In March 2016 there were 47,288 listed buildings in Scotland. Of these, 8% were Category A, and 50% were Category B, with the remaining 42% being Category C.

== See also ==
- List of listed buildings in Fife
