= List of listed buildings in Auchterarder, Perth and Kinross =

This is a list of listed buildings in the parish of Auchterarder in Perth and Kinross, Scotland.

== List ==
Name	Location	Date Listed	Grid Ref. (Note: Sometimes known as OSGB36, the grid reference (where provided) is based on the British national grid reference system used by the Ordnance Survey. • "Guide to National Grid". Ordnance Survey. • "Get-a-map". Ordnance Survey.)	Geo-coordinates	Notes	LB Number (Note: Historic Environment Scotland assign a unique alphanumeric identifier to each designated site in Scotland, for listed buildings this always begins with "LB", for example "LB12345".)	Image
Girnal House, High Street				56°17′48″N 3°42′24″W	Category B	21338	Upload Photo
Golf Hotel, 138 High Street				56°17′44″N 3°42′28″W	Category C(S)	21348	Upload Photo
200-206 High Street				56°17′41″N 3°42′40″W	Category B	21349	Upload Photo
St. Kattan's Chapel Aberuthven				56°19′02″N 3°39′41″W	Category B	5818	Upload Photo
St. Kattan's Churchyard Aberuthven (Old Part Only)				56°19′01″N 3°39′40″W	Category B	5820	Upload Photo
Old Parish Church Tower And Graveyard				56°17′49″N 3°42′23″W	Category B	21336	Upload Photo
36 And 38 High Street				56°17′50″N 3°42′11″W	Category C(S)	21346	Upload Photo
The Doo'Cot At 10 The Doocot, Coll Earn Castle Estate				56°17′56″N 3°42′07″W	Category B	21360	Upload Photo
Barony Parish Church, High Street				56°17′51″N 3°42′03″W	Category B	21342	Upload Photo
76 Feus				56°17′54″N 3°41′58″W	Category C(S)	21352	Upload Photo
Ruthven Tower Hotel, Abbey Hill				56°17′53″N 3°41′47″W	Category B	21357	Upload Photo
Strathearn Home Institution				56°17′05″N 3°43′38″W	Category C(S)	5811	Upload Photo
Foswell				56°16′42″N 3°40′42″W	Category B	5817	Upload Photo
Craiginver Aberuthven (Former Free Manse)				56°19′15″N 3°39′04″W	Category C(S)	5823	Upload Photo
St. Andrews And West Church, High Street				56°17′50″N 3°42′08″W	Category B	21343	Upload Photo
34 High Street				56°17′50″N 3°42′10″W	Category C(S)	21345	Upload Photo
Drumcharry, Montrose Road				56°17′47″N 3°42′15″W	Category B	21356	Upload Photo
Auchterarder House Stables				56°18′49″N 3°41′49″W	Category B	5814	Upload Photo
Smiddy Haugh Inn And Two Adjoining Houses Aberuthven				56°19′10″N 3°39′13″W	Category C(S)	5822	Upload Photo
Masonic Hall, 85-89 High Street				56°17′48″N 3°42′22″W	Category B	21339	Upload Photo
St. Kessog's Episcopal Church Off High Street				56°17′46″N 3°42′39″W	Category C(S)	21350	Upload Photo
St. Margaret's Hospital, Townhead				56°17′37″N 3°43′09″W	Category B	21354	Upload Photo
Rosewell Cottage Aberuthven				56°19′07″N 3°39′27″W	Category C(S)	5821	Upload Photo
Drumtogle Mill				56°19′40″N 3°38′58″W	Category C(S)	5824	Upload Photo
Aytoun Hall, High Street				56°17′48″N 3°42′24″W	Category C(S)	21337	Upload another image
Coll-Earn Castle Hotel, Hunter Street And High Street				56°17′59″N 3°42′12″W	Category B	21358	Upload Photo
Auchterarder House				56°18′43″N 3°41′55″W	Category B	5813	Upload Photo
House Of Coul				56°17′38″N 3°40′09″W	Category C(S)	5815	Upload Photo
Eaglesview, Upper Borland Park				56°17′36″N 3°43′26″W	Category C(S)	5825	Upload Photo
Mansefield, High Street				56°17′49″N 3°42′06″W	Category B	21344	Upload Photo
The Priory, Crown Wynd				56°17′42″N 3°42′21″W	Category C(S)	21355	Upload Photo
Coll-Earn Lodge, Hunter Street				56°18′02″N 3°42′05″W	Category B	21359	Upload Photo
Auchterarder House, West Lodge And Gates				56°18′45″N 3°42′07″W	Category B	5812	Upload Photo
Cloan				56°17′07″N 3°40′40″W	Category B	5816	Upload another image
65 And 67 High Street				56°17′49″N 3°42′19″W	Category B	21340	Upload Photo
Railway Hotel, 1 High Street				56°17′54″N 3°42′01″W	Category B	21341	Upload Photo
86, 88 And 90 High Street				56°17′47″N 3°42′21″W	Category C(S)	21347	Upload Photo
70 And 72 Feus				56°17′54″N 3°41′56″W	Category C(S)	21351	Upload Photo
St. Mackessog's Church And Churchyard				56°18′26″N 3°42′07″W	Category B	5810	Upload Photo
Montrose Mausoleum St. Kattan's Churchyard Aberuthven				56°19′02″N 3°39′40″W	Category A	5819	Upload another image See more images
Pairney Bridge (Disused) Off B 8062				56°17′56″N 3°39′41″W	Category B	5826	Upload Photo

== Key ==
The scheme for classifying buildings in Scotland is:

- Category A: "buildings of national or international importance, either architectural or historic; or fine, little-altered examples of some particular period, style or building type."
- Category B: "buildings of regional or more than local importance; or major examples of some particular period, style or building type, which may have been altered."
- Category C: "buildings of local importance; lesser examples of any period, style, or building type, as originally constructed or moderately altered; and simple traditional buildings which group well with other listed buildings."

In March 2016 there were 47,288 listed buildings in Scotland. Of these, 8% were Category A, and 50% were Category B, with the remaining 42% being Category C.
