= Perth College =

Perth College may refer to:

- Perth College UHI, college of higher education in Perth, Scotland
- Perth College (Western Australia), an Anglican girls' school in Perth, Western Australia
