= Andrew Fairlie =

Andrew Fairlie may refer to:

- Andrew Fairlie (actor) (born 1963), Scottish actor
- Andrew Fairlie (chef) (1963–2019), Scottish chef
