= Restaurant Andrew Fairlie =

Restaurant in Scotland

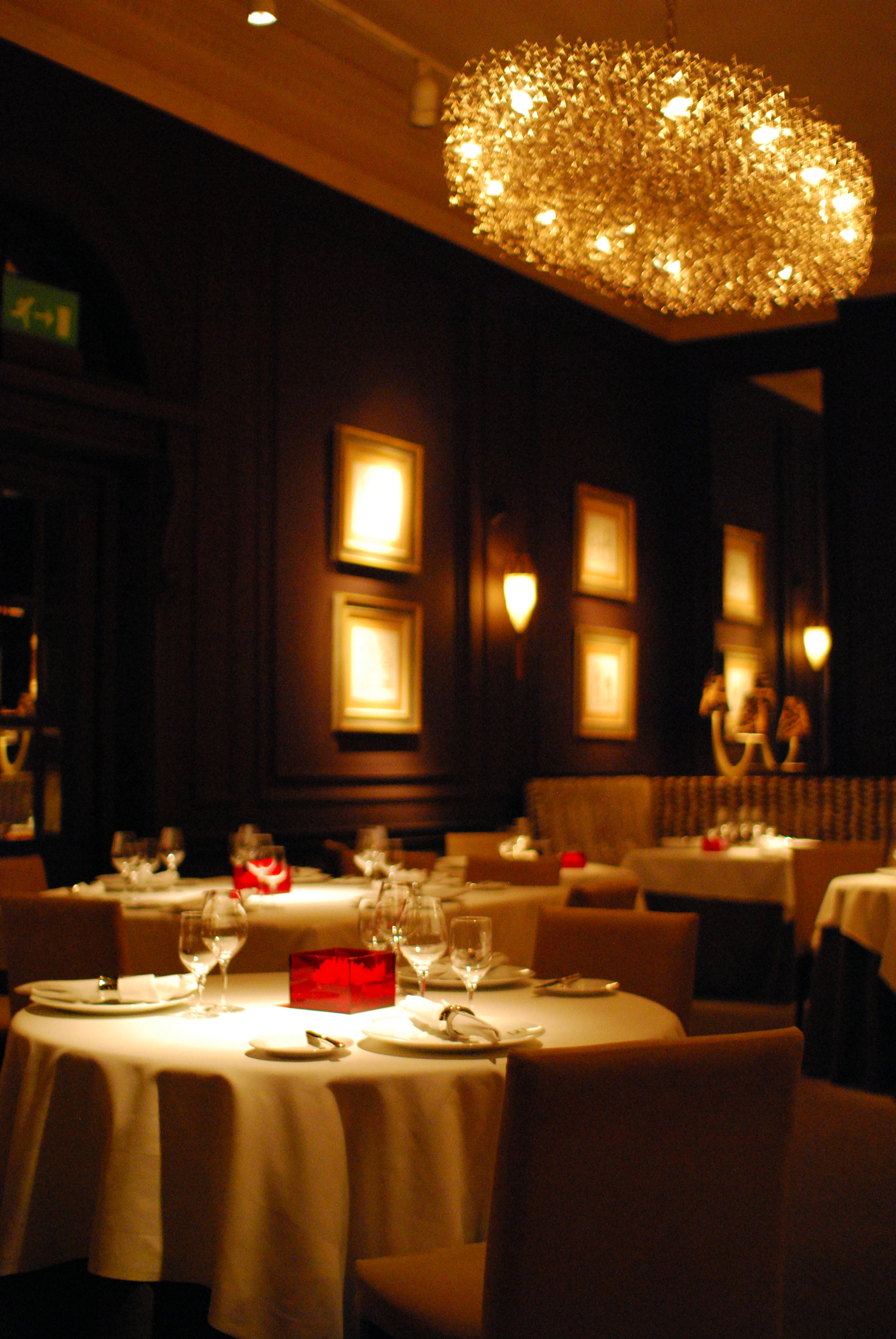
- The dining room at Restaurant Andrew Fairlie in 2008

- Location in Scotland

Restaurant information
- Head chef: Stevie McLaughlin
- Chef: Andrew Fairlie
- Food type: British/French
- Dress code: Casual
- Rating: (Michelin Guide); AA Rosettes (2026)
- Location: Gleneagles Hotel, Auchterarder, Perth and Kinross, PH3 1NF, Scotland
- Coordinates: 56°17′09″N 3°44′51″W
- Seating capacity: 50
- Reservations: Yes
- Website: www.andrewfairlie.co.uk

Restaurant Andrew Fairlie, also known as Andrew Fairlie at Gleneagles, is a restaurant serving British cuisine located within the Gleneagles Hotel near Auchterarder, Perth and Kinross, Scotland. In operation since 2001, it was run by chef Andrew Fairlie alongside his head chef Stephen McLaughlin who took over the kitchen after his death. It currently holds two Michelin stars, having been awarded them in 2006. It is the first restaurant in Scotland to hold two Michelin stars.

== History ==
After winning the inaugural Roux Scholarship, chef Andrew Fairlie worked in a number of kitchens. This included winning a Michelin star as the head chef of the restaurant at One Devonshire Gardens in Glasgow, before setting up his first restaurant, the self-titled Restaurant Andrew Fairlie, in 2001. Both his head chef Stevie McLaughlin and general manager Dale Dewsbury came with Fairlie when he transitioned from One Devonshire Gardens to Restaurant Andrew Fairlie. McLaughlin had worked his way up from sous chef, with other head chefs during this period including Darin Campbell.

To celebrate the restaurant's 15 years in operation, in 2016, Michel Roux and Alain Roux re-created some of the signature dishes from their three-Michelin-star restaurant The Waterside Inn in Bray, Berkshire. The collaboration took place over two nights, with dishes from both restaurants appearing on a set menu.

== Description ==
Restaurant Andrew Fairlie is located within the Gleneagles Hotel near Auchterarder, Perth and Kinross, Scotland. It is located within the interior of the hotel; the dining room has no windows. Fairlie was heavily involved in the design approach for the decoration, selecting a textured deep black-brown paint by Farrow & Ball for the walls. Many of the design components featured in the restaurant are bespoke; the black crockery was created by John Maguire, as are the chandeliers and carpet. Gregor Mathieson was hired to design the space, and later became Fairlie's business partner at the restaurant. They were inspired by the works of Archie Forrest, and placed works by the artist on the walls of the dining room. The restaurant leased a 2 acres (9,700 sq yd) walled Victorian-style kitchen garden, some 10 miles (16 km) away from the hotel.

== Menu ==
When the restaurant first opened, Fairlie said that the dishes served were exacting in their requirements. He recalled a pork dish "that had three elements and they all had to be in proportion in terms of size and form". He added that the design of the plates himself were once important to him, saying "There are certain dishes I'd never put on a rectangular plate – chicken breast or a whole pigeon, for example. It just wouldn't look right." At one point, Fairlie sought to recreate the deconstruction style of dishes seen at restaurants such as El Bulli and El Celler de Can Roca, which he called a "silly period" and reverted following customer feedback.

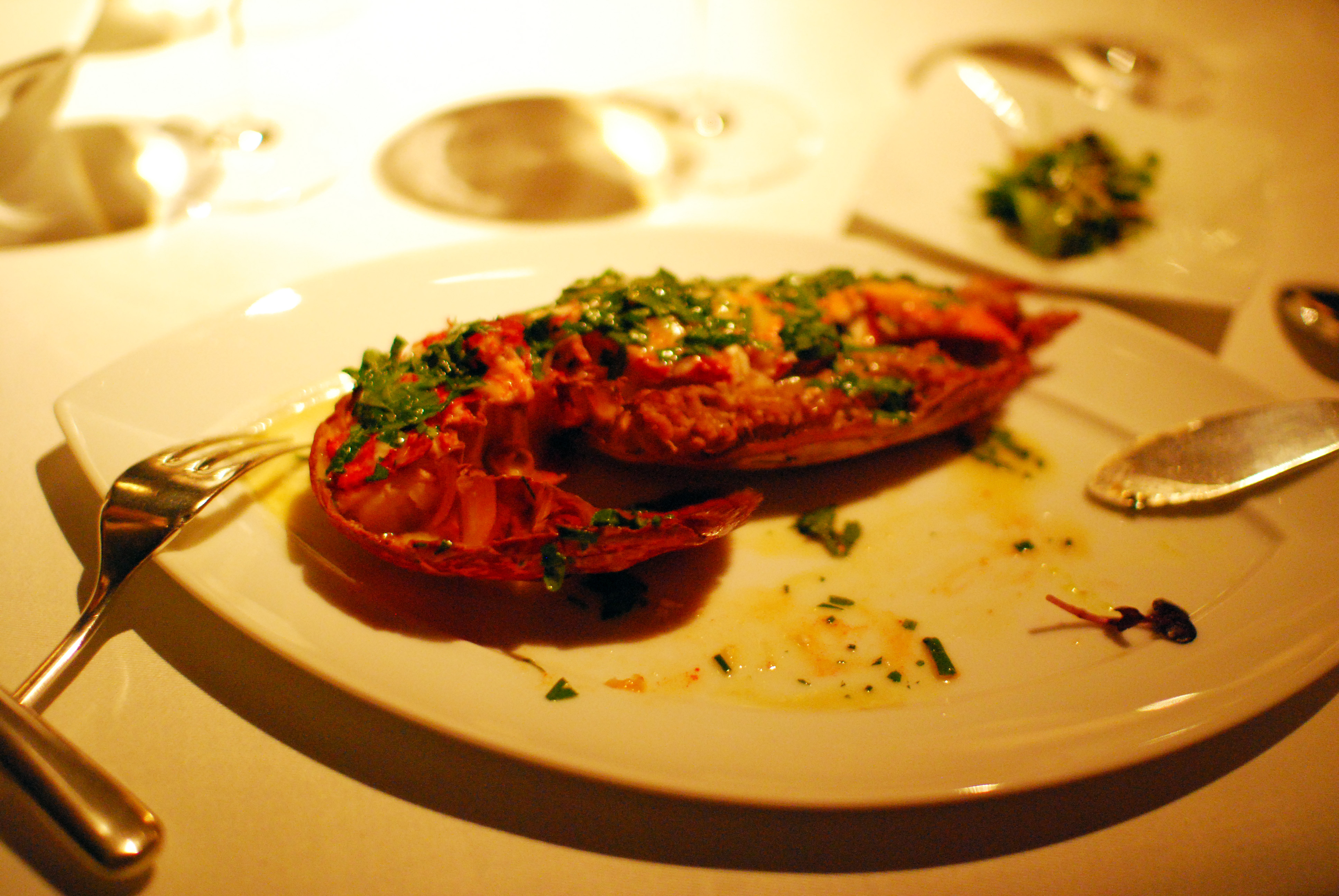
A grilled lobster starter with lime and herb butter

Following the introduction of a du marche (market) menu, Fairlie said that this allowed them to be more creative with a freeform plating style. This menu was created on the basis of the availability of produce from suppliers described by Fairlie as "flexible, changing, exciting and interesting" and allowed the restaurant to place dishes on the menu which otherwise would never have been served at the restaurant. Since 2012, Fairlie has been delegating the creation of some dishes to McLaughlin, with both their designs appearing on the menu. With the kitchen garden in production, the hope was that would enable them to reintroduce unusual heritage flavours from Scotland.

Restaurant Andrew Fairlie has a close connection with Champagne Krug. Following the launch of the vintage Krug Clos d’Ambonnay 2000, Fairlie and McLaughlin cooked for a barbecue party held in the restaurant's walled kitchen garden in 2015 by the vintners. The restaurant was one of ten restaurants in the UK to be selected to hold a full allocation of six bottles of the new vintage. Krug Champagnes are popular at the restaurant, with Krug Grand Cuvee being matched to the signature tasting dish of smoked lobster. This dish is created by removing the meat from the lobster shells, cold smoking it over whisky casks, and placing it back in the shells, before baking it at a high temperature with butter, herbs and lime juice.

== Reception ==
Gillian Glover visited the restaurant in 2004 for The Scotsman, calling the lobster dish with lime and herb butter "so compelling public demand will ensure the poor chap is still smoking lobster shells in his eighties". She agreed with her dining partner that the meal was the best she had eaten in Scotland. Richard Bath, of the newspaper Scotland on Sunday, was apprehensive of the complexity of the dishes when he visited the restaurant in 2008. However, he was pleased at the "unfussiness" of the menu, praising the veal loin served with veal shin and sweetbreads. He said that the "delicate flavours of the loin meshing with the richer, darker tones of the juicy shin, and rounded off with the tender, velvety sweetbreads to produce an exquisitely balanced dish." He gave the meal a rating of nine out of ten.

A year after opening, the restaurant was awarded a Michelin star. A second star was added in 2006. In 2012, the Sunday Times named Restaurant Andrew Fairlie as the best restaurant in the United Kingdom. Chef Michel Roux described the restaurant in 2016 as a "temple of gastronomy in Scotland". The Good Food Guide placed the restaurant in ninth position in its list of the best restaurants in the United Kingdom that year. This was the highest position achieved by any Scottish-based restaurant. Restaurant Andrew Fairlie has featured in the top 100 restaurants listing by Elite Traveler on several occasions. In 2017, it became the first Scottish establishment included in Les Grandes Tables du Monde, a guide listing the most distinguished restaurants in the world.

=== Junior chefs ===
In 2015, Jonathan Ferguson, one of the chefs at the restaurant, was named the Young Chef of the Year by the British Culinary Federation. The following year, he became a finalist at the Young National Chef of the Year competition.

Junior sous chef Lorna McNee was the winner of the fifth annual Game Chef cook-off in 2016. This was the first time that a female chef had won the competition. She said "I am staggered to have won and I owe it all to the patience and skill of Andrew and of head chef Stevie McLaughlin, who mentored me." When asked about female chefs at Restaurant Andrew Fairlie, she added "We’ve always had women in our kitchen here. Girls have a calming influence on the boys. They have more elegance in their cooking than guys, and because they have smaller, more delicate hands they can do better in plating up and presentation of small items like game birds."

== See also ==
- List of Michelin-starred restaurants in Scotland
