= The Kitchin =

Coordinates: 55.977°N 3.173°W

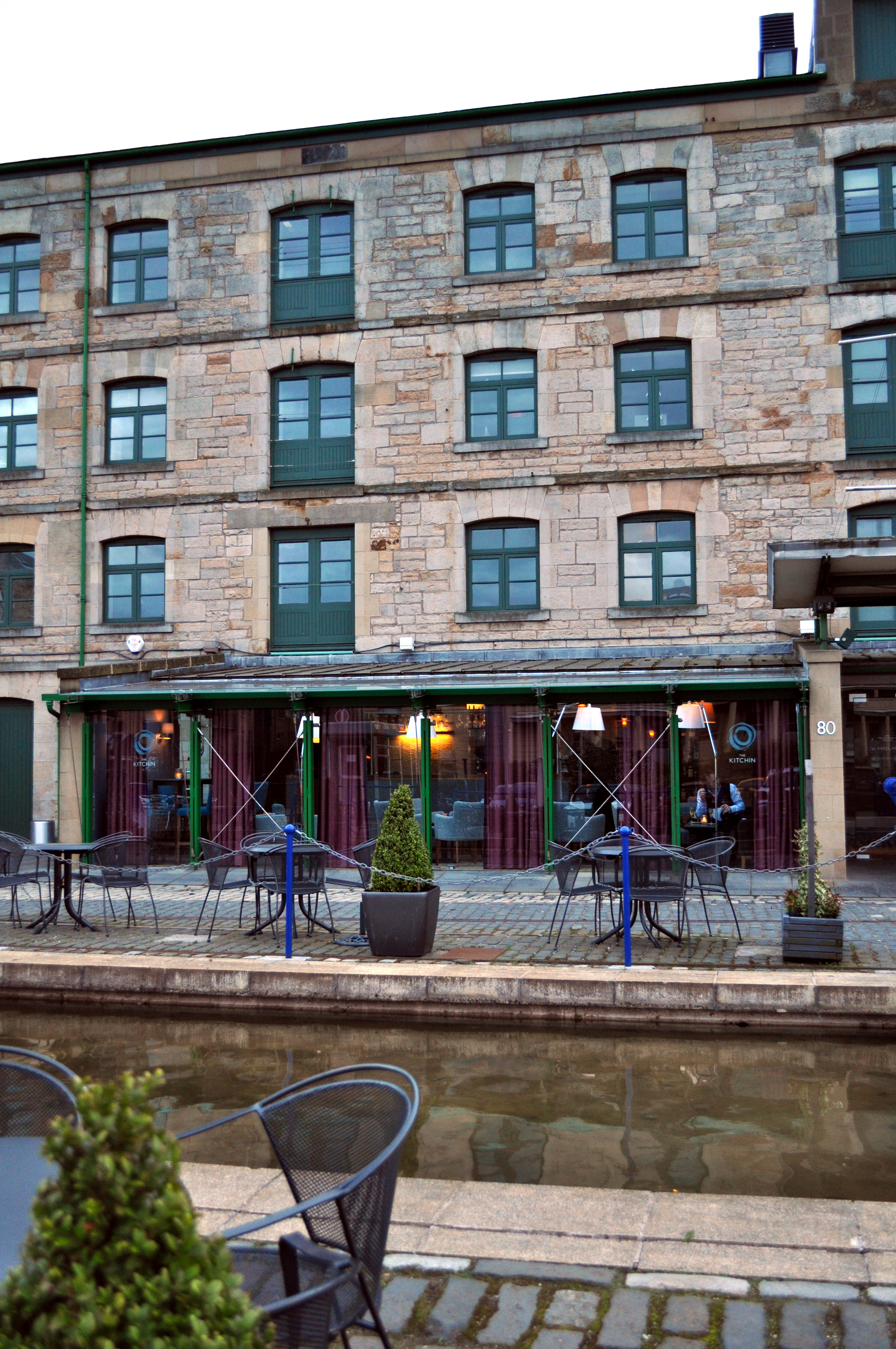
- Interactive map of The Kitchin

Restaurant information
- Established: 2006
- Owner: Tom Kitchin
- Head chef: Tom Kitchin
- Food type: French cuisine
- Rating: (Michelin Guide); AA Rosettes (2026)
- Location: 78 Commercial Quay, Edinburgh, EH6 6LX, Scotland, UK
- Seating capacity: 60 covers
- Website: www.thekitchin.com

The Kitchin is a fine dining restaurant in Edinburgh, Scotland, run by Tom Kitchin and his wife Michaela (née Berseilus). It serves fresh Scottish produce in a French style from Kitchin's time spent with Alain Ducasse and Guy Savoy. It was awarded a Michelin star within six months of opening.

== Description ==
The Kitchin was opened by Tom Kitchin and then fiancée Michaela Berseilus in June 2006. The building is a former whisky bond on the waterfront in the Leith area of Edinburgh. The imprint of Kitchin's work with Alain Ducasse and Pierre Koffmann is noticeable in the style of food served, and the restaurant has received support from other chefs that Kitchin has worked with; including opening with the cutlery and plates formerly used at the three-Michelin-starred restaurant La Tante Claire, operated by Koffman. The interior of the restaurant is decorated with dark woods and shades of grey by design company Cubit Design, and wallpapers by Jocelyn Warner. A window opens from the dining room onto the kitchen area itself, and it has a conservatory-style bar serving snacks and light meals.

The food merges seasonal Scottish produce with French styles and techniques; the restaurant has the mantra "from nature to plate". While chef Tom Kitchin was away filming The Great British Menu for the BBC in March 2008, Pierre Koffman came out of retirement to stand in as head chef.

Within six months of opening, The Kitchin was awarded a Michelin star. In 2009 the restaurant was voted as the second-best restaurant in Britain by Eat Out Magazine, and the best restaurant in the UK by Observer Food Monthly in 2010. The team behind The Kitchin opened a second restaurant, Castle Terrace, in July 2010.

In June 2021, former workers of the Kitchin made allegations of bullying, violence and sexual assault in his restaurants. One alleged a chef burned a woman's arm with a hot tray from an oven, while another claimed staff were repeatedly punched if they were not fast enough. On 3 July, Tom Kitchin suspended two members of staff following these allegations. Kitchin Group said the claims would be "fully and independently" investigated.

== Reception ==
A.A. Gill, writing in The Sunday Times, gave The Kitchin five stars out of five, praised the common-sense approach of the menu construction, and described his food as "the best and most agreeable dinner I've eaten all year". The Independent's Terry Durack gave the restaurant sixteen out of twenty, praising the informality and the avoidance of normal Michelin-star cuisine, but said that the fish course was the "duff note of the night".

== See also ==
- List of Michelin-starred restaurants in Scotland
