= Aytoun Hall =

Municipal building in Auchterarder, Scotland

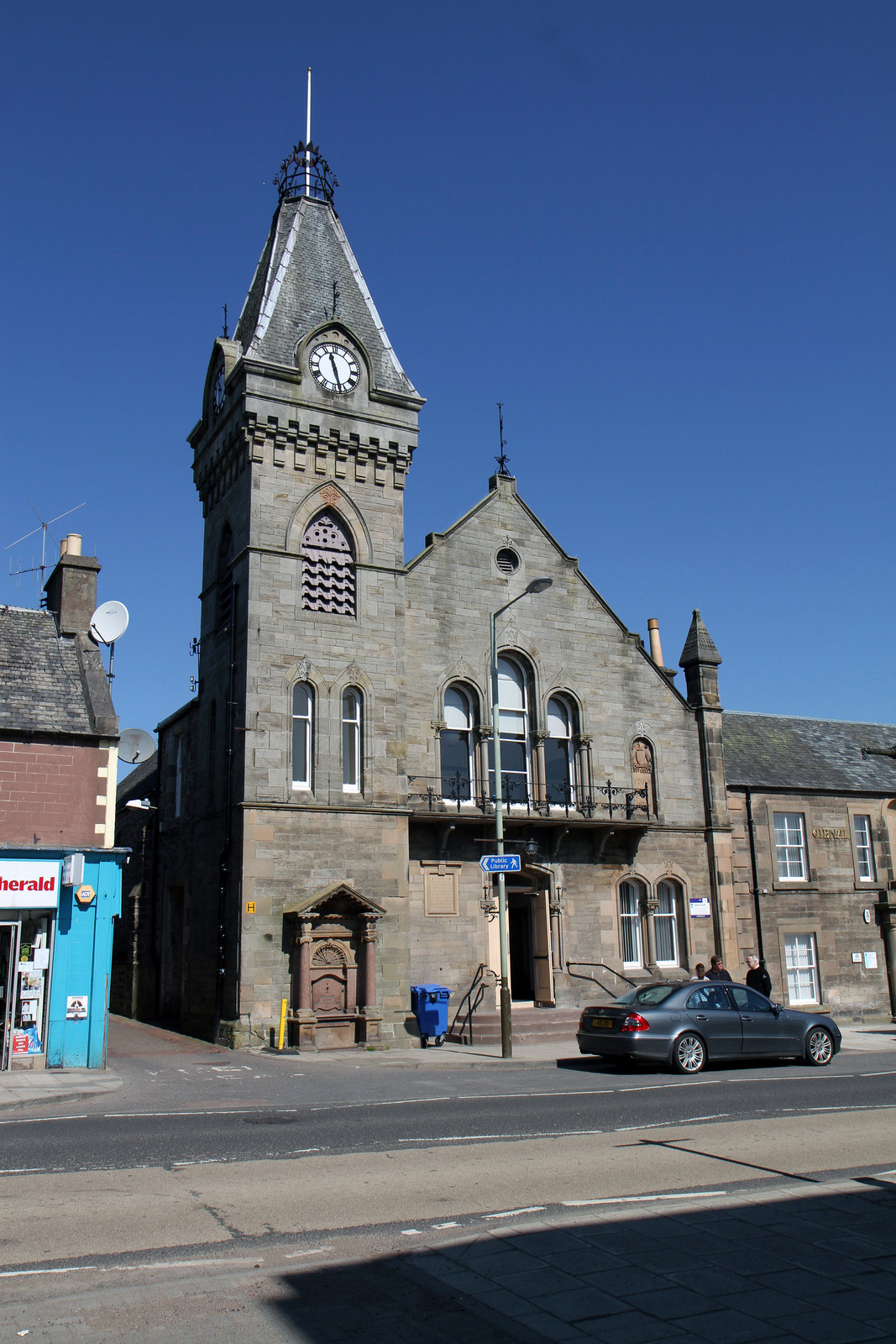
- Aytoun Hall

- Shown in Perth and Kinross
- 56.2966°N 3.7064°W
- Location: High Street, Auchterarder

History
- Built: 1872

Site notes
- Architect: Charles Sandeman Robertson
- Architectural style: Gothic Revival style

Listed Building – Category C(S)
- Official name: Aytoun Hall, High Street
- Designated: 5 October 1971
- Reference no.: LB21337

Aytoun Hall, also referred to as Auchterarder Town Hall, is a municipal building in the High Street, Auchterarder, Perth and Kinross, Scotland. The structure, which is currently used as community events venue, is a Category C listed building.

== History ==
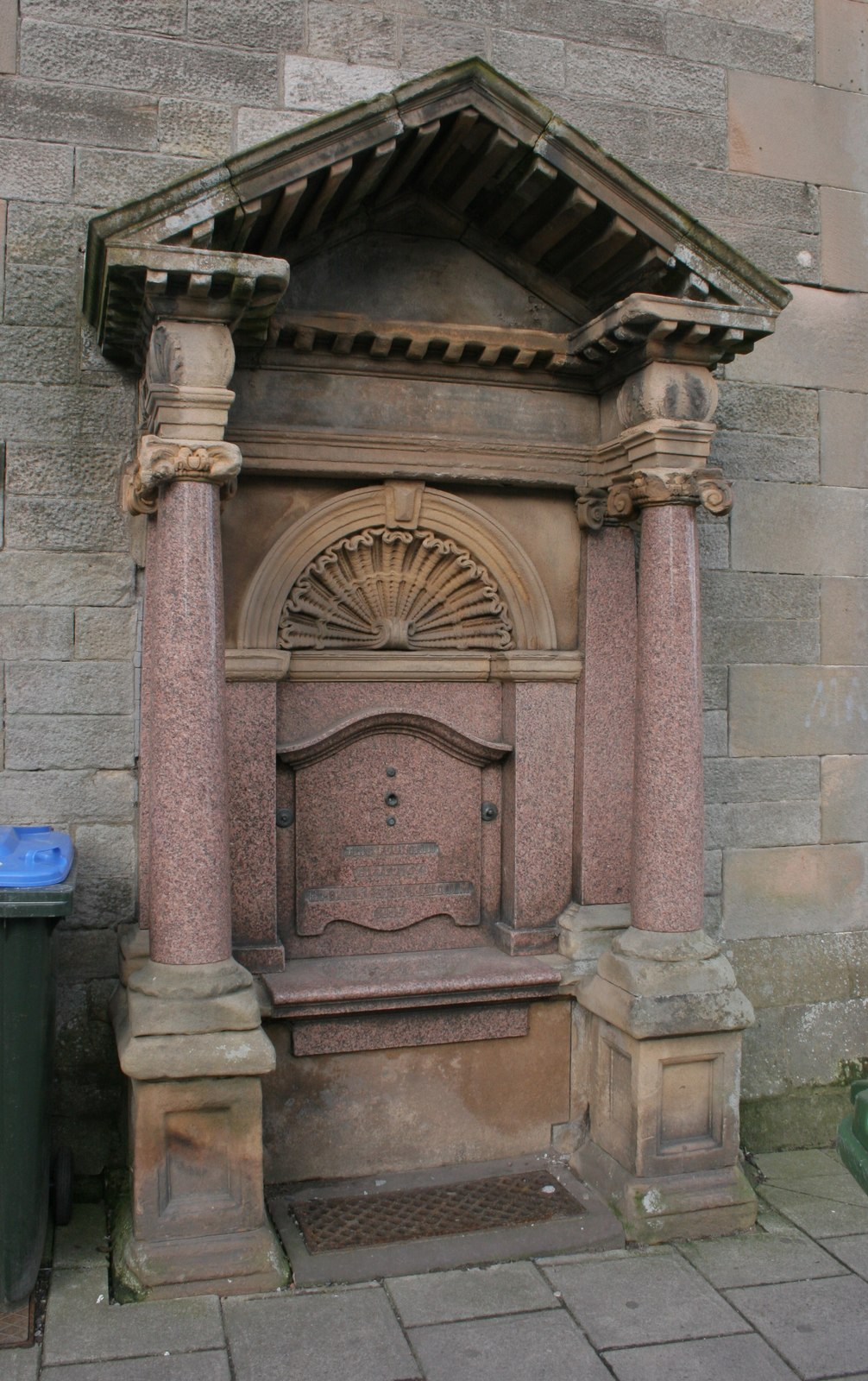
The fountain at the base of the tower

The building was commissioned as a community events venue by a group of local businessmen led by a local mill owner, William Hally. The site they chose for the new building was on the north side of the High Street and it was named after a local landowner, Captain Marriott Chadwick Walker Aytoun of the Royal Artillery, who had led an initiative to build an aqueduct which had brought a water supply from Crook Moss Spring, some 3 miles (4.8 km) to the west of the town, some 40 years earlier.

The building was designed by Charles Sandeman Robertson in the Gothic Revival style, built in ashlar stone at a cost of £2,000 and was completed in 1872. The design involved an asymmetrical main frontage of three bays facing onto the High Street. The left-hand bay, which was slightly projected forward, was formed by a three-stage tower. The first stage of the tower was blind, the second stage contained a pair of lancet windows and the third stage contained a louvred opening with voussoirs. It was surmounted by a modillioned cornice, a series of gablets containing clock faces, a pyramid-shaped spire and a flagpole. The central bay included a doorway on the ground floor and a Venetian window in the gable above, while the right-hand bay contained a pair of round headed windows on the ground floor and a niche containing a coat of arms on the first floor. Internally, the principal room was the main assembly hall.

Following significant population growth, largely associated with the handloom industry, the area became a police burgh in 1892. A library building, which was financed by the Scottish-American industrialist, Andrew Carnegie, was erected behind the hall and was officially opened in the presence of William Hally, Andrew Carnegie and the Lord Provost of Glasgow, Sir James Bell, on 28 September 1896.

In order to commemorate the Coronation of Edward VII and Alexandra, the new burgh leaders agreed to acquire the building from the original developers, for use as the burgh offices and meeting place, in October 1902. A fountain in the form of an aedicula was donated by the former bailie, Peter Malcolm, and installed at the base of the first stage of the tower in 1905. The building continued to serve as a community events venue and performers included the musician, Jimmy Shand, in 1961.

The building also continued to serve as the meeting place of the burgh council for much of the 20th century but ceased to be the local seat of government when the enlarged Perth and Kinross District Council was formed in 1975. Instead it became the meeting place of the Auchterarder and Aberuthven Community Council.

An extensive programme of refurbishment works, financed by the Scottish Government and Perth and Kinross Council and undertaken by Mansell Construction at a cost of £975,000, was initiated in July 2009. The programme of works, which were managed by the Auchterarder Leisure and Recreation Association, involved the installation of a new lift compatible with the requirements of the Equality Act 2010, the creation of a new room known as the Girnal Hall on the first floor, and the fitting out of a commercial kitchen. The works were completed in January 2011.

== See also ==
- List of listed buildings in Auchterarder, Perth and Kinross
