= Lathones =

Coordinates: 56.26°N 02.85°W

- Location within Fife
- Council area: Fife
- Country: Scotland
- Sovereign state: United Kingdom
- Police: Scotland
- Fire: Scottish
- Ambulance: Scottish

Lathones (/lə'θonz/) is a village in Fife, Scotland, located approximately six miles (10 km) south west of St Andrews, in the parish of Cameron in the Riggin o Fife.

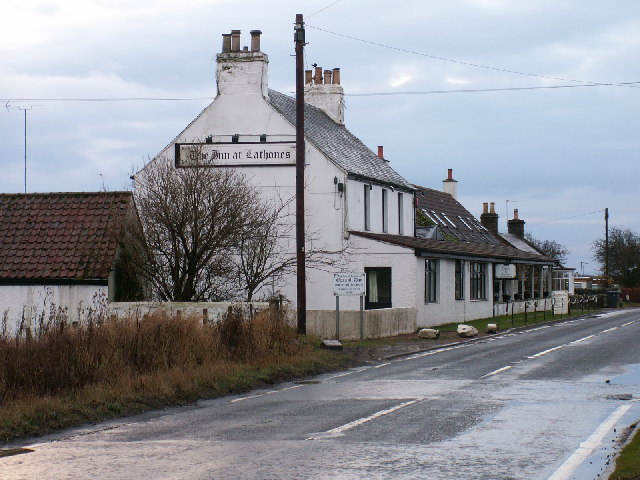
Lathones

The place-name 'Lathones' if first attested between 1452 and 1480 as 'Lathone'. The etymology is uncertain but thought to be from Scottish Gaelic 'leth' ('half, side') and 'tòn' ('backside, arse'). If so, the name was once 'leth thòine' ('the half of the rounded hill').

Lathones was formerly a mining village.

One of the main attractions at Lathones is the Inn at Lathones, which features regular live music acts, and has included famous artists such as Henry McCullough (former guitarist of Paul McCartney's band Wings) and Bob Catley (singer from the band Magnum). The Inn at Lathones won the award of "Music Pub of the Year" at the Publican Awards in 2008.

== See also ==
- Mundell music
