= Riggin o Fife =

Upland area of Fife, Scotland

Coordinates: 56.27°N 2.83°W

The Riggin o Fife is an upland area of Fife, Scotland which runs eastward from the Markinch Gap and the Howe of Fife to form the elevated hinterland to the coastal villages of the East Neuk. At 290 m, Largo Law is the highest hill, with other high points including Clatto Hill (248 m), Drumcarrow Craig (217 m), Flagstaff Hill (207 m), Kellie Law (182 m) and Hill of Tarvit (211 m). The area is rural, populated by farms and hamlets, with a few small villages, such as Largoward and Peat Inn.

Riggin denotes a high ridge, the roof, the backbone, the exposed parts or the watershed.

William Wilkie, agriculturalist and professor of natural philosophy at the University of St Andrews, conducted successful experiments in moorland farming at his farm at Cameron.

From 1898 to 1964, the Riggin was served by the East Fife Central Railway mineral and goods line.

The area lends its name to a pipe jig.
