= Parklands Hotel =

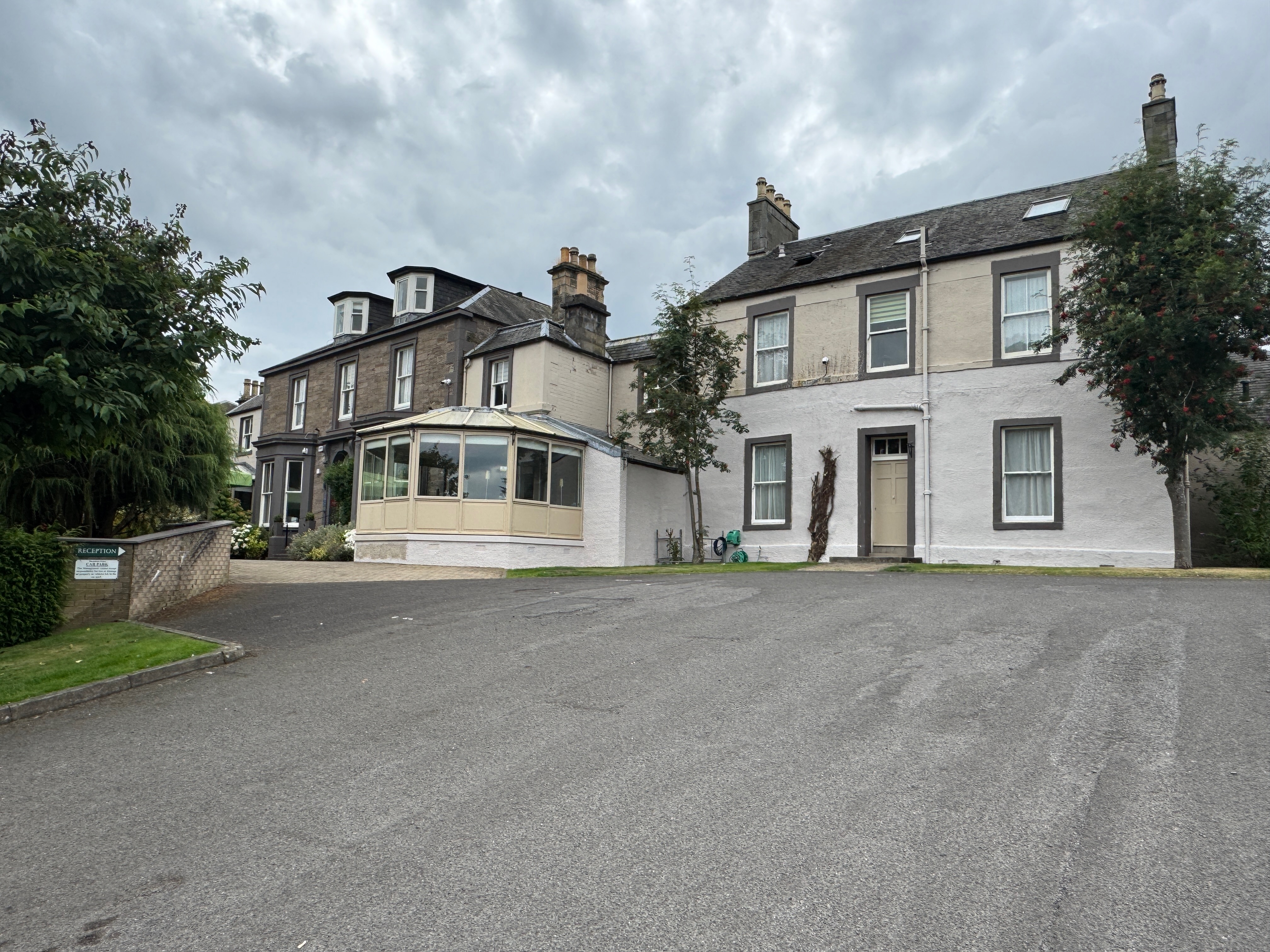
- The buildings in 2024, viewed from King's Place, looking west

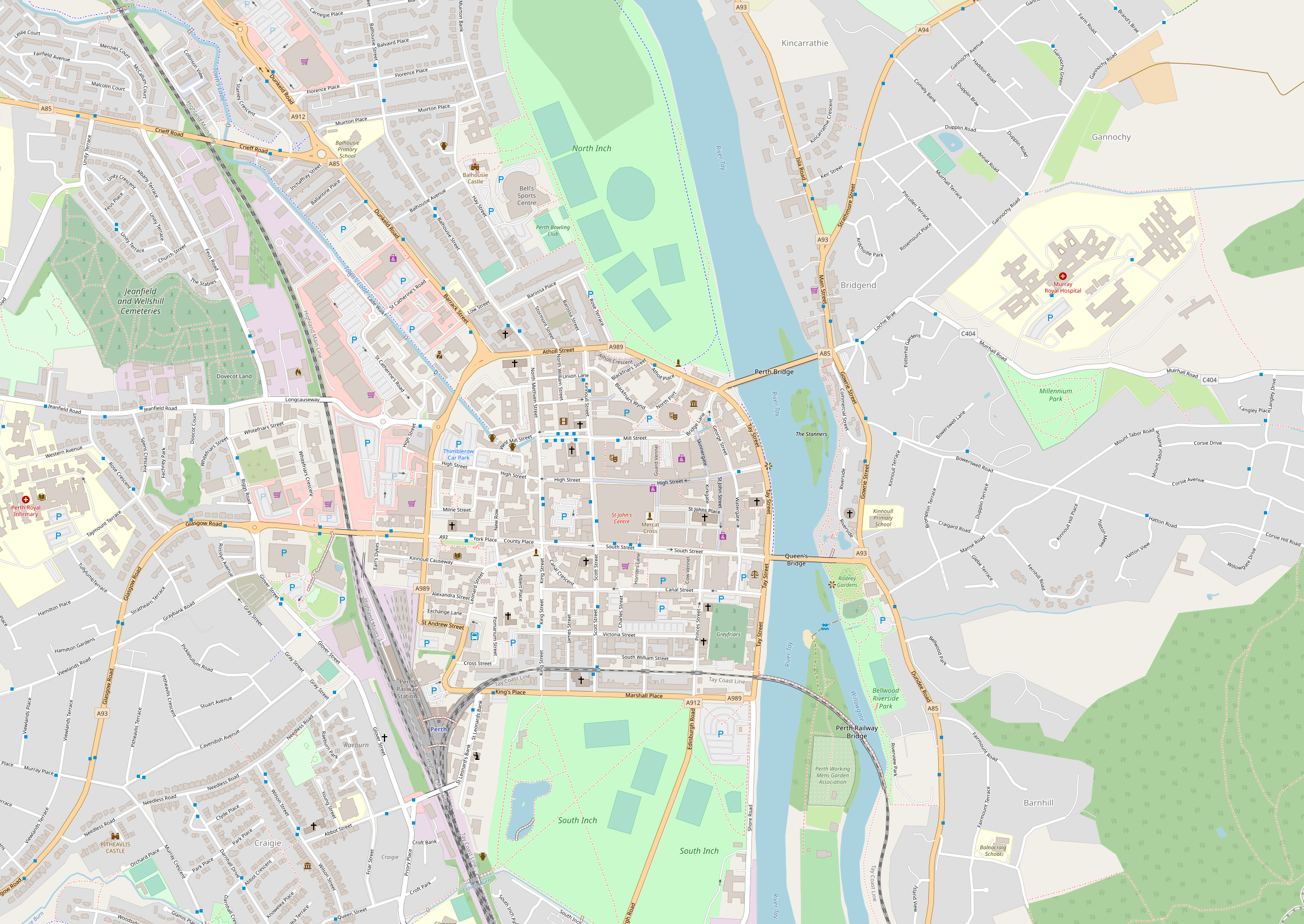
- Location within Perth
- 56.391745°N 3.436481°W
- Location: 1–2 St Leonard's Bank; Perth; Scotland

History
- Built: late 18th century and late 19th century

Site notes
- Architectural style: Victorian
- Website: http://www.theparklandshotel.com/

Listed Building – Category C(S)
- Designated: 26 August 1977
- Reference no.: LB39622

Parklands Hotel (officially Parklands Boutique Hotel with Dining) is a historic building in Perth, Perth and Kinross, Scotland. Located on St Leonard's Bank, it is a Category C listed building comprising two villas that have been combined into one business. When viewed from St Leonard's Bank, the villa on the left (closest to King's Place) dates to the 19th century, the one on the right to the 18th century. In the early 20th century, the property was owned by London, Midland and Scottish Railway, likely due to its proximity to Perth railway station, which is about 200 feet (67 yd) to the west. It is also close to Perth bus station.

The properties, which were previously the Atholl Hotel and Inch Park Hotel, overlook the northwestern corner of the city's South Inch. It has fifteen bedrooms. The hotel's bistro is named No.1 Bank. A double-AA Rosette restaurant, it was formerly named 63@Parklands, a sister restaurant to executive chef and Blairgowrie native Graeme Pallister's 63 Tay Street, which was established in 2007. No.1 The Bank opened a beer garden in the summer of 2020.

St Leonard's Bank, originally called Marshall's Bank, was laid out by the city's architect William Macdonald Mackenzie in 1828 on land which belonged to the Glover Incorporation.

Parklands, Perth's only four-star-rated hotel, has been owned since 2003 by Scott and Penny Edwards.

A 1975 view

== See also ==
- List of listed buildings in Perth, Scotland
