= Peat Inn =

Hamlet in Fife, Scotland

Coordinates: 56.27660°N 2.88495°W

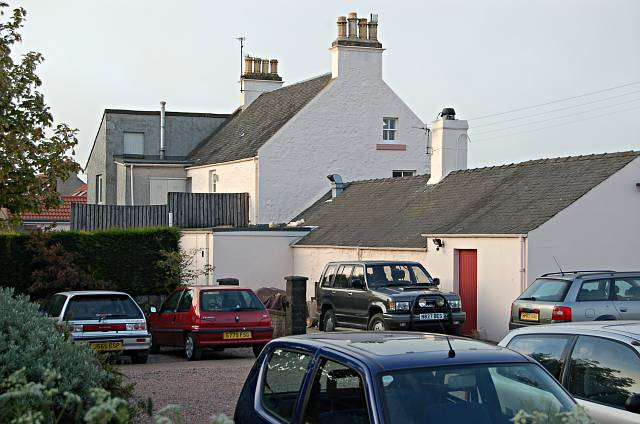
The Peat Inn

Peat Inn is a hamlet in Fife, Scotland, around 7 miles (11 kilometres) southeast of Cupar on the B940 and 6 miles (10 kilometres) southwest of St Andrews, in the Riggin o Fife. The hamlet is centred on a Michelin-starred restaurant with rooms after which the village takes its name.

== Restaurant ==
The Peat Inn consists of three dining room serving lunch and dinner. Chef Geoffrey Smeddie has been running the restaurant since 2006 serving a seasonal menu of modern cuisine. The restaurant has received a Michelin star.
