= Largoward =

Coordinates: 56.257828°N 2.8580493°W

- Location within Fife
- Population: 419
- OS grid reference: NO4694007589
- Council area: Fife
- Lieutenancy area: Fife
- Country: Scotland
- Sovereign state: United Kingdom
- Post town: Leven
- Postcode district: KY9
- Police: Scotland
- Fire: Scottish
- Ambulance: Scottish
- UK Parliament: North East Fife
- Scottish Parliament: North East Fife

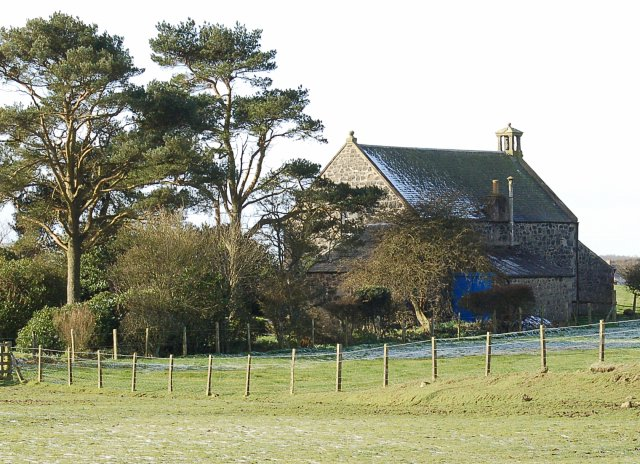
Largoward Church

Largoward is a village in East Fife, Scotland, lying on the road from Leven to St Andrews in the Riggin o Fife, 4½ miles north-east of Lower Largo and 6½ miles south-west of St Andrews. It is an agricultural and former mining village, one of the three main villages of the civil parish of Kilconquhar, along with Colinsburgh and the village of Kilconquhar. Coal must have been worked for a considerable length of time in the district, as it is recorded that coal was driven annually from Falfield, just north-west of the village, to Falkland Palace for the use of King James VI.

Largoward and District Community Council covers the northern part of the civil parish of Kilconquhar, plus the Cassingray area to the east (Carnbee parish).

The name probably means Largo's field, Largo parish and Largo Law being just west of the village. The name Largoward is recorded from the 18th century. Ward or waird is a Scots word meaning an enclosed piece of land, chiefly for pasture. Although in the parish of Kilconquhar, it appears to have had a connection with the parish or barony of Largo as regards tenure. The word ward appears in the neighbouring placenames of Balcarres Ward (Kilconquhar parish), West Ward and Knights Ward (Carnbee parish).

The population of the village and the adjacent settlements is 419 (2011 Census).

== Church ==
Until 1835 the church for Largoward was the parish church at Kilconquhar, about 5 miles away. Because of this distance, the present church building in Largoward was erected as a chapel of ease in 1835. Following a petition presented in July 1857, under the New Parishes (Scotland) Act, 1844, Largoward was made a parish, for ecclesiastical purposes only, in 1860.
