= Andrew Fairlie (chef) =

Scottish chef (1963–2019)

- Born: 21 November 1963; Perth, Scotland
- Died: 22 January 2019 (aged 55); Auchterarder, Perth and Kinross, Scotland
- Education: Perth Academy
- Spouse: Kate Fairlie
- Culinary career
- Cooking style: British/French
- Rating: Michelin stars
- Current restaurant: Restaurant Andrew Fairlie

Andrew Fairlie (21 November 1963 – 22 January 2019) was a Scottish chef. He was the head chef of Restaurant Andrew Fairlie, an independent business within the Gleneagles Hotel and Resort in Auchterarder, Perth and Kinross. Restaurant Andrew Fairlie is one of two restaurants in Scotland with two Michelin stars.

== Early life and education ==
Fairlie was born in Perth, Scotland, and grew up in the city's Letham area. At age 15, he began his training in Perth under chef Keith Podmore, having become interested in food after starting a job polishing glasses at a hotel. At age 20, he was awarded the first Roux Scholarship, giving him the chance to train with French chef Michel Guérard at Les Pres d'Eugenie in Les Landes. Fairlie also spent time working at the Hôtel de Crillon in Paris.

== Career ==
After returning to the UK, he held a number of positions before returning home to Scotland. At One Devonshire Gardens—where he was appointed head chef in 1994—he won his first Michelin star, the only one in Glasgow at the time. Fairlie opened his own restaurant at the Gleneagles Hotel in 2001 and received a Michelin star within eight months. At Gleneagles he created his signature dish, a locally sourced lobster smoked over whisky barrel chips. He also began growing rare fruits and vegetables for use in his dishes. In 2005, Fairlie catered the 31st G8 summit. The restaurant was awarded a second Michelin star in 2006. In 2017, Restaurant Andrew Fairlie became the first Scottish establishment included in Les Grandes Tables du Monde, a guide listing the most distinguished restaurants in the world.

On 6 November 2018, Fairlie announced he would step down from his Gleneagles restaurant after revealing he had a terminal brain tumour, and would leave the operation of the restaurant to his head chef and business partner effective February 2019.

== Highlights and awards ==
In 2002, Hotels magazine voted Restaurant Andrew Fairlie one of the world's top ten hotel restaurants. In the same year he became the inaugural Scottish Chef of the Year. During the G8 Summit 2005 he cooked for the Queen and 44 of the world's leaders. In 2006, he was AA Chef's Chef of the Year. He was named a Relais & Chateaux Grand Chef du Monde in 2011, one of just seven in the UK. In 2012 Restaurant Andrew Fairlie topped the Sunday Times Food List of the top 100 UK restaurants.

== Politics ==
During the Scottish independence referendum in 2014, Fairlie declared his support for Scottish independence. He was a member of the Yes Scotland's campaign advisory board.

== Personal life ==
Fairlie was first diagnosed with cancer in 2005. He was first married to Ashley, with whom he had two daughters, but the marriage ended in divorce. After receiving his terminal diagnosis, he married his partner, Kate, in November 2018.

His father Jim Sr. and brothers Philip Fairlie and Jim Jr. are all involved in politics with the Scottish National Party. Philip is a councillor while Jim Jr. is an MSP.

== Death ==
Fairlie died on 22 January 2019 from a brain tumour. His family announced his death.

== See also ==
- List of Michelin starred restaurants in Scotland
