= Cameron, Fife =

Parish in Fife, Scotland

Coordinates: 56.294437°N 2.8344780°W

Cameron
- Location within Fife
- Population: 415
- OS grid reference: NO4845011646
- Council area: Fife
- Lieutenancy area: Fife
- Country: Scotland
- Sovereign state: United Kingdom
- Post town: Leven, St Andrews
- Postcode district: KY9 and KY16
- Police: Scotland
- Fire: Scottish
- Ambulance: Scottish
- UK Parliament: North East Fife
- Scottish Parliament: North East Fife

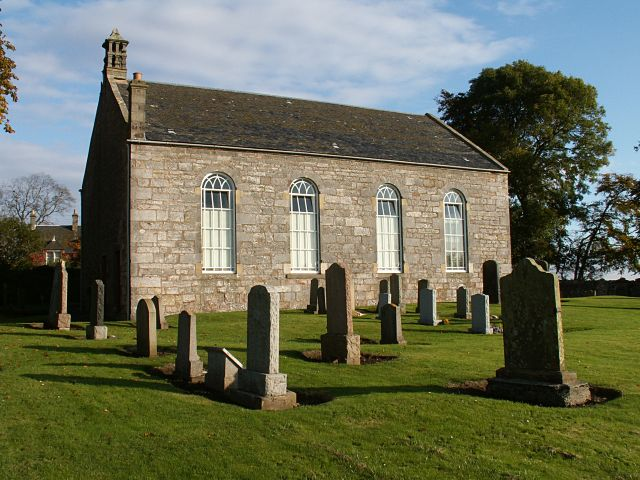
Cameron Parish Church

Cameron is a parish in east Fife, Scotland, 3½ miles south-west of St Andrews.

It is bounded on the north by the parish of St Andrews, on the east by Dunino, on the south by Carnbee and Kilconquhar, and on the west by Ceres. From east to west it is 5 – 6 miles long and in breadth about 4 miles.

The earliest forms of the name are from the twelfth century and appear as Cambrun. The etymology of the name is uncertain: it may derive from Pictish, Scottish Gaelic, or be a Gaelicised Pictish name. The first element could thus be Gaelic cam or its Pictish cognate *cam (both meaning 'crooked'), and the second element could be a Pictish word *brun, cognate with Welsh bryn ('hill'), or Gaelic bruinne ('chest, front, breast') or perhaps brú ('belly'). The later development of the name was influenced by the widespread Scottish personal name Cameron (from Gaelic cam shròn 'crooked nose').

It contains the hamlets of Lathones, Denhead (first mentioned in 1581, from Scots den, 'steep valley', and heid, 'head or end', thus 'the end of the steep valley') and Radernie (first mentioned in 1329, from Gaelic ràth 'ring-fort' and an uncertain second element, possibly Gaelic àirne 'sloe', feàrnach 'alder', or Èirinn 'Ireland').

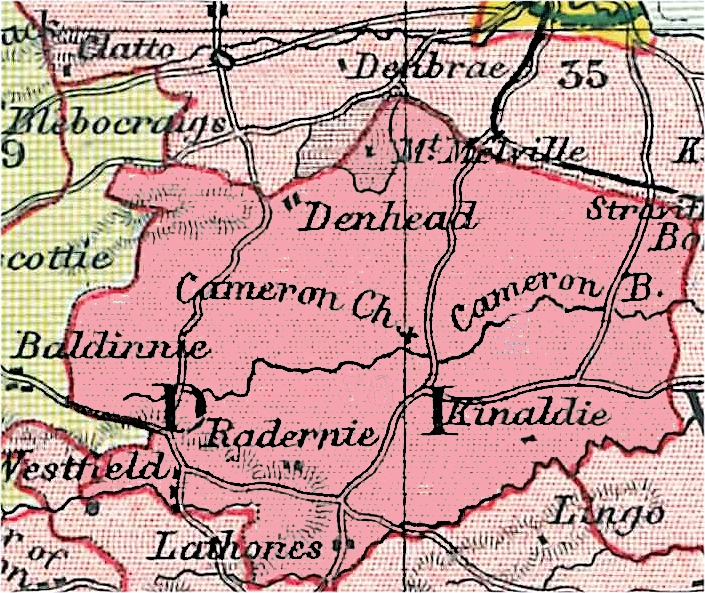
Parish of Cameron (1900)

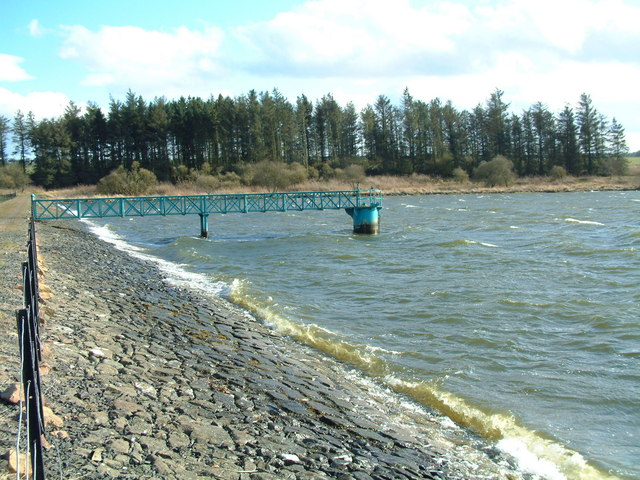
Cameron Reservoir

The civil parish has a population of 415 and its area is 9325 acres. It is also a Community Council area. The number of community councillors to which each area is entitled is determined by population and Cameron is therefore entitled to eight councillors.

Cameron was originally part of the parish of St Andrews, but was erected into a separate parish in 1645 by act of parliament and the first minister of the parish, George Nairne, was inducted in 1646. With the Local Government (Scotland) Act 1894 the Parish Council was established. It ceased in 1930 when parish councils in Scotland were abolished, but civil parishes persist for census and other non-administrative purposes.

The church is nearly in the centre of the parish, just north of Cameron Burn as it leaves Cameron Reservoir. It was built in 1808 to a plain design, replacing the old church on the same site which was in a very ruinous state. The church is covered in blue slate, with a belfry on the west gable. Ecclesiastically the parish is now linked to the parish of St. Leonards in the town of St Andrews, with the minister covering both churches.

The most significant mansion in the parish is that of Mount Melville, former residence of the Melville family, which lies just inside the northern boundary of the parish. It was acquired in 1698 for General George Melville of Strathkiness and the present house was constructed in 1820-1821. The house and grounds continued in Melville family ownership until 1901. In 1947 Mount Melville house and gardens were acquired by Fife County Council with the mansion becoming a maternity hospital known as Craigtoun Hospital. The gardens were then established as Craigtoun Country Park.

During the 19th century, the burgh of St Andrews implemented several poorly planned schemes to provide a public water supply to the town, but problems were resolved in 1911 when they built Cameron reservoir, in the centre of the parish, which supplied water to St Andrews from then until the early 2020s.
