= UHI Perth =

College in Scotland

Coordinates: 56°24′20″N 3°27′38″W

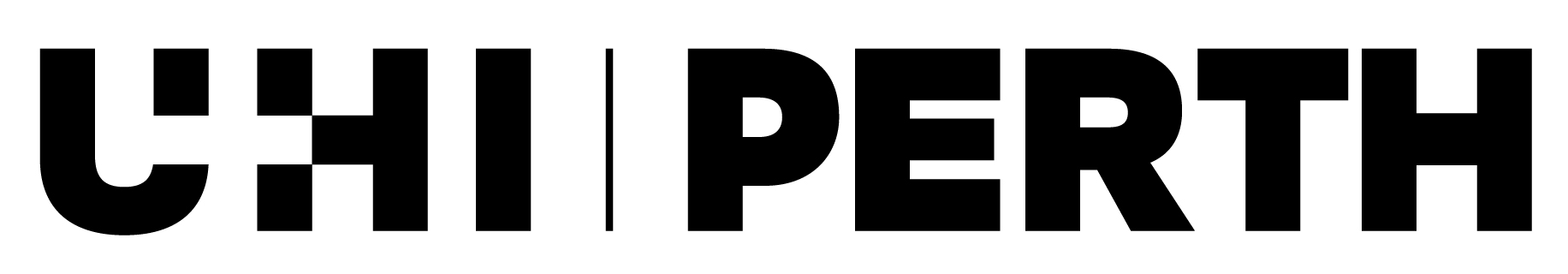
- Type: College
- Established: 1961
- Affiliations: University of the Highlands and Islands
- Principal: Catherine Etri
- Administrative staff: ~500
- Students: ~7000
- Location: Perth, Scotland
- Website: https://www.perth.uhi.ac.uk

UHI Perth provides further education and higher education in the city of Perth, Scotland, through a main campus and by distance learning.

Courses include degrees, through its membership of the University of the Highlands and Islands, as well as work-based learning and vocational training. Degrees available include aircraft engineering, music, child and youth studies, social sciences and computing.

Its English language school is a member of English UK and courses are approved by the British Council.

== Research and Innovation ==
As part of the UHI network, UHI Perth contributes to applied research and innovation in areas such as renewable energy, rural development, and digital technologies. Staff and students engage in research projects that address local challenges and support sustainable growth.

The Centre for Mountain Studies (CMS) was established at UHI Perth in August 2000, with the objective of creating a centre of excellence for work in mountain areas within the University of the Highlands and Islands.

== History ==
The college started in the Old Academy building on Perth's Rose Terrace in 1961 offering day-time further education (FE) courses in building trades, before expanding into a centre in Nelson Street (site of the Southern District School) soon afterwards.

Originally called Perth Technical College, the institution went on to be called Perth College of Further Education. After incorporation it was changed to Perth College. Due to its involvement in the University of the Highlands and Islands, it is now UHI Perth. Gaining university status in 2011 has allowed the institution to award degrees for university courses.

The first part of its Crieff Road campus — the Brahan Building — was officially opened on 16 October 1971 by the then Secretary of State for Scotland, Gordon Campbell.

Built on the site of the Pullars family home, the college cost £1.25 million and had 24 full-time lecturers teaching 700 students.

In 2001, Perth College became a founding academic partner of the University of the Highlands and Islands (UHI), a regional partnership of colleges and research institutions. With UHI gaining full university status in 2011, the institution was granted the authority to award degrees. Later, as part of a unified identity across the partnership, the college adopted the name UHI Perth, reflecting its dual role in delivering both further and higher education.

UHI Perth owns Air Service Training (AST), which has been delivering aeronautical engineering courses since 1934. AST is UK CAA approved and based at Perth Airport. Staff from organisations including British Airways, BMI, Malaysia Airlines, Aer Lingus, Kuwait Airways, Air Mauritius and Air Seychelles have been trained there. The company entered administration on 10 April 2025

On 18 April 2025, UHI Perth's finance director left his role.

== Current structure ==
Today, UHI Perth employs around 500 full-time and part-time teaching and non-teaching staff and has around 9,000 student enrolments.

Previously run by the local authority, it is now governed by a Board of Management made up of the principal, staff representatives and volunteers from business, education and the wider community in and around Perth and Kinross.

On 19 May 2023, UHI Perth announced it needs to lose 50 staff in phase one of a money-saving exercise with closures of the nursery, salons and the sports academy being sold to a franchise. The closure of the salons and selling of the sports academy did not occur.

== Campus ==
The campus is located in the city of Perth, Scotland, providing modern facilities including teaching blocks, specialist labs, workshops, and student services. The campus also houses the Academy of Sport and Wellbeing, which includes a gym, climbing wall, and sports therapy facilities.

== Notable alumni ==
- Graeme Pallister, chef
- Fergus Purdie, architect
