= Auchterarder =

Town in Perth and Kinross, Scotland

Coordinates: 56.293167°N 3.706142°W

Auchterarder: Scottish Gaelic: Uachdar Àrdair
- Town
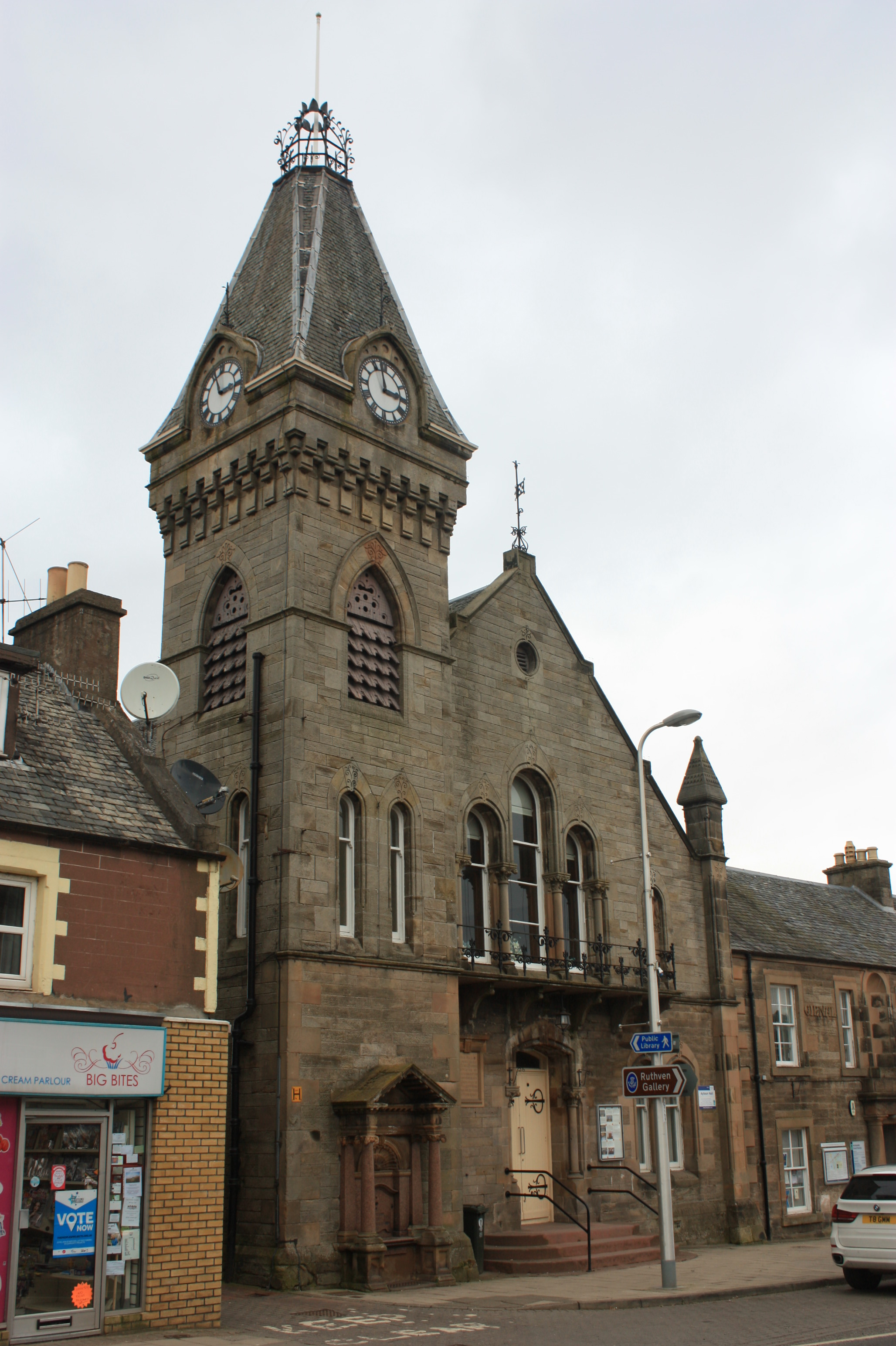
- Auchterarder Town Hall

- Location within Perth and Kinross
- Population: 6,061 (2022)
- OS grid reference: NN945125
  - Edinburgh: 31 mi (50 km)
  - London: 361 mi (581 km)
- Council area: Perth and Kinross
- Lieutenancy area: Perth and Kinross
- Country: Scotland
- Sovereign state: United Kingdom
- Post town: AUCHTERARDER
- Postcode district: PH3
- Dialling code: 01764
- Police: Scotland
- Fire: Scottish
- Ambulance: Scottish
- UK Parliament: Perth and Kinross-shire
- Scottish Parliament: Perthshire South and Kinross-shire

Auchterarder (/ɒxtərˈɑːrdər/; Scottish Gaelic: Uachdar Àrdair, meaning Upper Highland) is a town north of the Ochil Hills in Perth and Kinross, Scotland. Once part of the historic county of Perthshire, it is home to the Gleneagles Hotel. The 1 1/2-mile-long (2.5-kilometre) High Street of Auchterarder gave the town its popular name of "The Lang Toun" or Long Town.

Auchterarder had a population of 6,061 in 2022, indicating an increase from 4,444 in 2011. The modern town is a shopping destination with a variety of independent shops and cafes.

== History ==
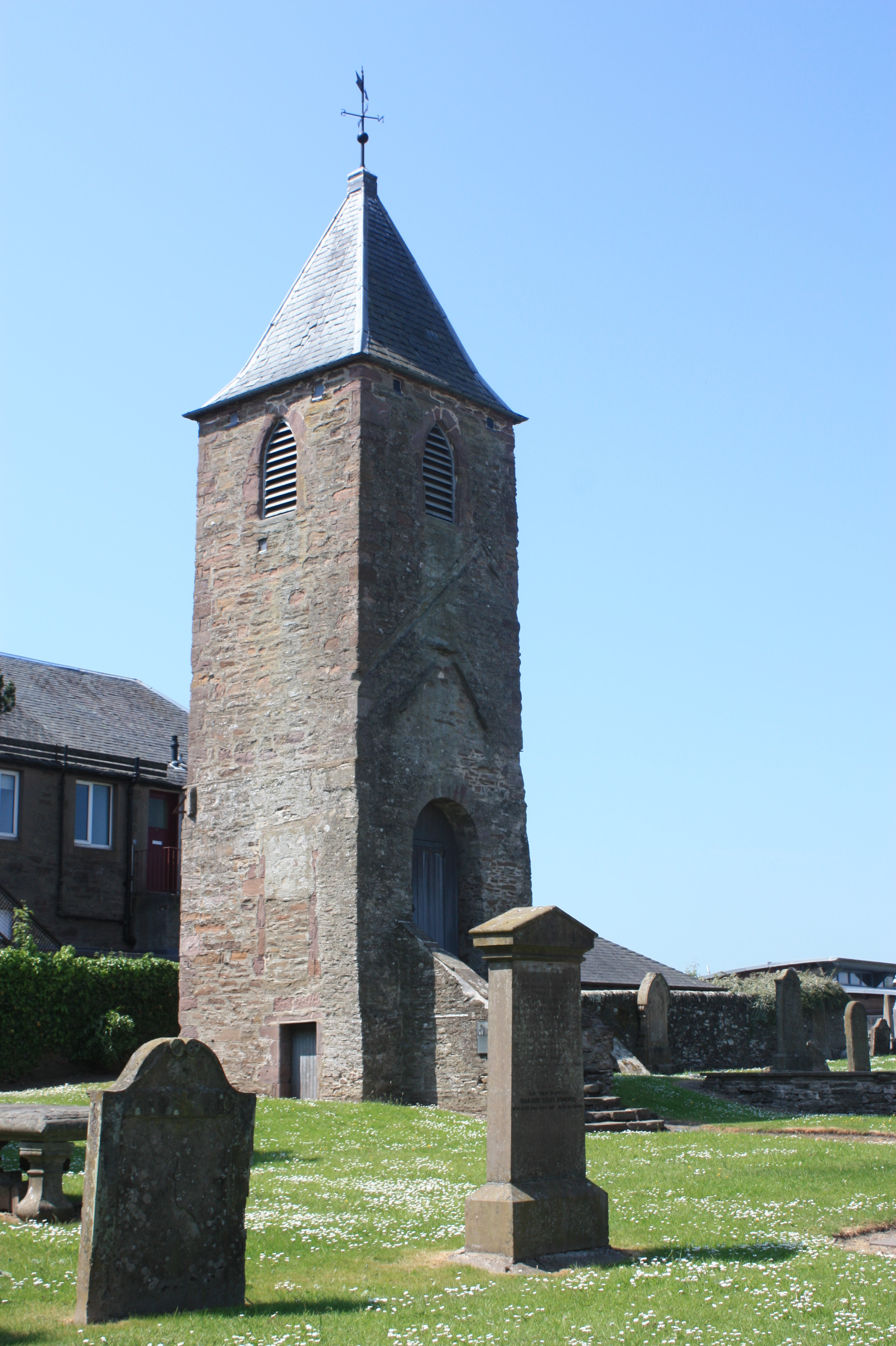
Old church tower, Auchterarder, dating from 1660

The name "Auchterarder" derives from the Scottish Gaelic roots uachdar, àrd, and dobhar; it means ‘upland of high water.’

South West of the settlement close by to the Gleneagles train station is a pair of Pictish standing stones, one of the two depicts a carved image of a bird on it.

Auchterarder Castle stood to the north of the town in the area now known as Castleton. It is said to have been a hunting seat for King Malcolm Canmore in the 11th century and was visited by King Edward I in 1296. It was made ruinous in the 18th century and only fragments remained at the end of the 19th century.

In the Middle Ages, Auchterarder was known in Europe as 'the town of 100 drawbridges', a colourful description of the narrow bridges leading from the road level across wide gutters to the doorsteps of houses. The name appears in a charter of 1227 in a grant of land transaction to the Convent of Inchaffray. The Jacobite Earl of Mar's army torched the town on 25 January 1716.

In 1834, a controversy over the selection of a parish minister, following the recent passing of the Veto Act, allowed the parishioners of Auchterarder to reject the chosen minister, Rev. Robert Young. Whilst this might have ended with the selection of an alternative, Young took the issue to the High Court. The court's decision concluded a link between state and church, directly contradicting the church's own view, and causing the first in a chain of events which would ultimately lead to the 1843 schism in the Church of Scotland. The remains of this church – the tower – have recently been renovated, and there is a plaque explaining what the church used to look like. As a result of the troubles of 1834, Auchterarder became one of the first towns in Scotland to build its own independent Free Church, indeed appearing to pre-empt the Disruption by commissioning the architect David Cousin to design their church in advance, such that it was completed in 1843 as soon as the Free Church formally came into existence.

Aytoun Hall, which is the main community events venue in the town, was completed in 1872.

The Burgh Police (Scotland) Act 1892 (55 & 56 Vict. c. 55) bestowed burgh status upon the town and a provost, two bailies, an honorary treasurer, Dean of Guild and six councillors were appointed to manage its affairs.

In 1983 the A9 road was diverted to the south, bypassing Auchterarder and Aberuthven, to improve the connection between Stirling and Perth.

The 31st G8 summit was held in the town in July 2005 at the five-star Gleneagles hotel.

In 2024, Queens Crescent in Auchterarder had the most expensive house prices in Scotland.

== Auchterarder House ==
In 1784 the Duke of Perth, in his capacity as Baron of Auchterarder, sold a large swathe of his estate to the Hon. Basil Cochrane who in turn sold it to Lt Col James Hunter, who in 1831 commissioned William Burn to design a large house in the Jacobean style, standing around 2 km north of the town. Around 1870 the house was sold to James Reid, a Glasgow businessman connected to locomotive building, who commissioned John James Burnet to internally refurbish the house in 1887. Reid's son, Hugh Reid, inherited the property in 1894, at that time Hugh being head of the North British Locomotive Company. Around 1905 Hugh added a tower and rebuilt the entrance. He was knighted in 1922 for services to the British locomotive industry.

== Old Parish Church ==
The original church, now ruined, lies 1 km north of the town, midway to Auchterarder House. on the B8062. It was built in 1200 and dedicated to St Kessog and was under the control of the Abbey of Inchaffray. St Kessog's Well stands nearby the church. A second chapel, dedicated to St Mary, stood in the town itself and was later rededicated as the parish church.

== Transport ==
Gleneagles railway station, which is located around 2 miles (3 km) to the south-west of Auchterarder, has been the railway station for the town since 1886.

Auchterarder contains a charger operated by Perth and Kinross Council located in Crown Inn Wynd for electric vehicle charging.

The town boasts a Community Bus Service which is low cost to normal users and free to young people and the elderly. The service links the three main residential areas of Auchterarder, namely the South, Townhead and the High Street as well as the two new developments near Hunter Street. The service connects to the local health centre and hospital.

== Climate ==
Auchterarder has an oceanic climate (Köppen: Cfb). The nearest weather station to Auchterarder is located at Strathallan, around 2 1/4 miles (3.6 kilometres) northwest.

Climate data for Strathallan (35 m or 115 ft asl, averages 1991–2020, extremes 1960–present)
Month	Jan	Feb	Mar	Apr	May	Jun	Jul	Aug	Sep	Oct	Nov	Dec	Year
Record high °C (°F)	13.9 (57.0)	14.5 (58.1)	20.8 (69.4)	24.1 (75.4)	27.8 (82.0)	31.0 (87.8)	30.7 (87.3)	29.4 (84.9)	26.3 (79.3)	23.2 (73.8)	17.0 (62.6)	14.4 (57.9)	31.0 (87.8)
Mean daily maximum °C (°F)	6.5 (43.7)	7.3 (45.1)	9.2 (48.6)	12.1 (53.8)	15.2 (59.4)	17.7 (63.9)	19.6 (67.3)	19.4 (66.9)	16.9 (62.4)	12.9 (55.2)	9.2 (48.6)	6.6 (43.9)	12.7 (54.9)
Mean daily minimum °C (°F)	0.4 (32.7)	0.7 (33.3)	1.8 (35.2)	3.7 (38.7)	5.8 (42.4)	8.8 (47.8)	10.6 (51.1)	10.3 (50.5)	8.4 (47.1)	5.4 (41.7)	2.4 (36.3)	0.2 (32.4)	4.9 (40.8)
Record low °C (°F)	−18.8 (−1.8)	−15.2 (4.6)	−13.3 (8.1)	−6.2 (20.8)	−3.4 (25.9)	−2.8 (27.0)	−0.2 (31.6)	0.7 (33.3)	−2.3 (27.9)	−7.5 (18.5)	−11.7 (10.9)	−19.5 (−3.1)	−19.5 (−3.1)
Average rainfall mm (inches)	117.7 (4.63)	86.4 (3.40)	76.4 (3.01)	53.8 (2.12)	61.0 (2.40)	70.8 (2.79)	81.1 (3.19)	77.4 (3.05)	69.3 (2.73)	109.2 (4.30)	99.3 (3.91)	110.0 (4.33)	1,012.4 (39.86)
Average rainy days (≥ 1 mm)	15.5	12.6	12.6	9.9	11.3	12.0	12.0	11.5	11.7	14.5	14.8	14.5	152.9
Source 1: Met Office
Source 2: Starlings Roost Weather

== Notable people ==
- Andrew Fairlie (1963–2019), two-Michelin-starred chef, worked at Gleneagles
- Eve Graham (born 1943), singer with The New Seekers, was born in Auchterarder
- Sandy Gunn (1919–1944), Spitfire photo reconnaissance pilot shot down and taken prisoner in Norway during the Second World War, and executed after the "Great Escape"
- Reverend Robert Haldane (1764–1842), religious writer and theologian, preached here 1797 to 1806
- Stephen Hendry (born 1969), seven-time world snooker champion, lived in Auchterarder
- James Kennaway (1928–1968), novelist and screenwriter, was born in Auchterarder
- Reverend Dr G. A. Frank Knight (1869–1937), minister of the Free Church 1892–1900
- Rev Robert Nisbet (1814–1874), religious author, went to Auchterarder School
- Professor John Monteath Robertson (1900–1989), crystallographer
