= List of coalfields =

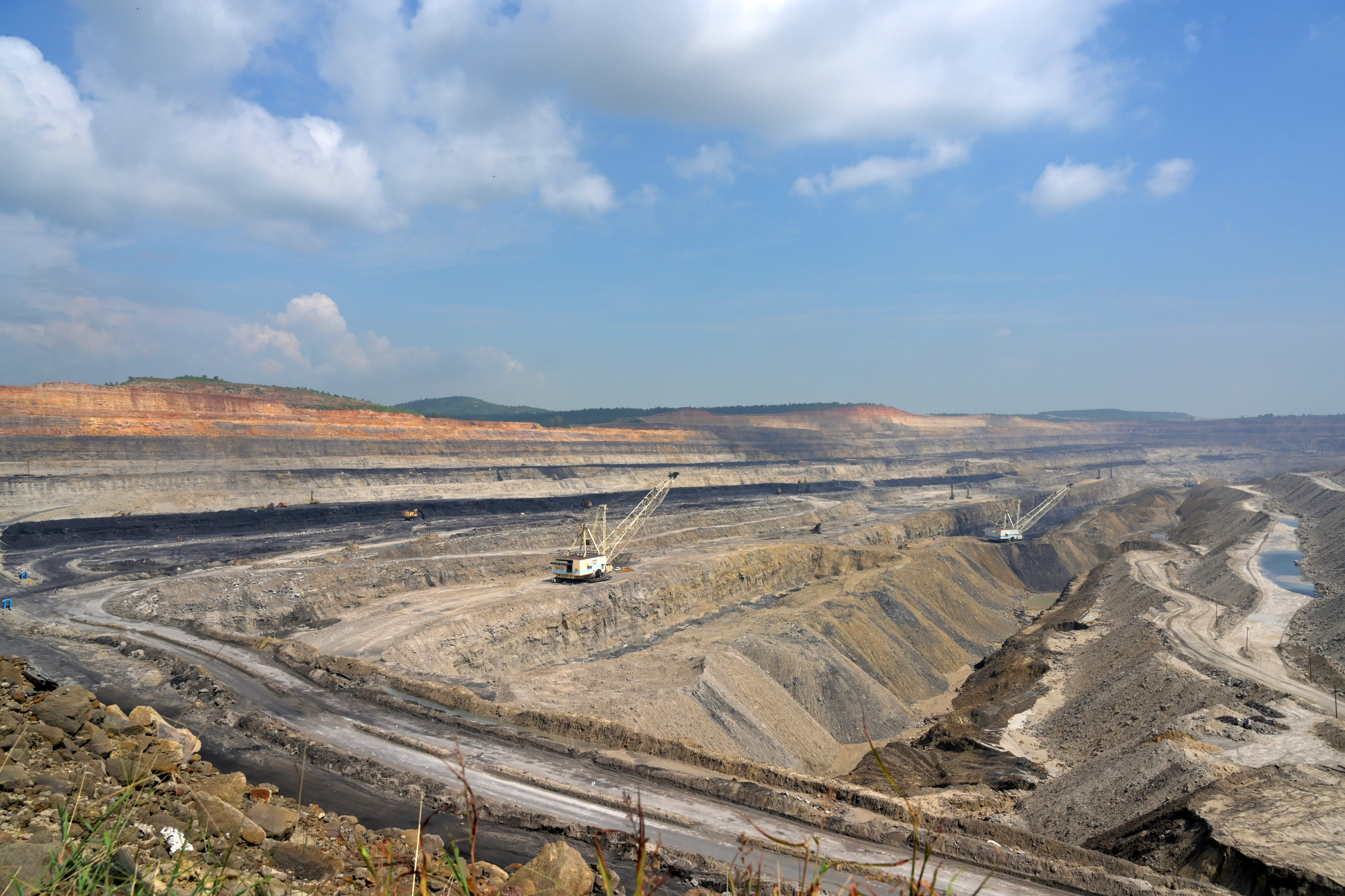
A vast strip mine in the Singrauli Coalfield

A coalfield is an area of certain uniform characteristics where coal is mined. The criteria for determining the approximate boundary of a coalfield are geographical and cultural, in addition to geological. A coalfield often groups the seams of coal, railroad companies, cultural groups, and watersheds and other geographical considerations. At one time the coalfield designation was an important category in business and industrial discussions. The terminology declined into unimportance as the 20th century progressed, and was probably only referred to by a few small railroads and history buffs by the 1980s. Renewed interest in industrial heritage and coal mining history has brought the old names of the coalfields before a larger audience.

== Australia ==
=== New South Wales ===
- Gunnedah Basin coalfields
- Hunter Valley coalfields
- South Maitland coalfields
- Sydney Basin coalfields

=== Queensland ===
- Bowen Basin coalfields
- Galilee Basin coalfields
- Surat Basin coalfields
- Walloon coalfields

=== Victoria ===
- Latrobe Valley coalfields

=== Western Australia ===
- Collie coalfields

== Belgium ==
- Borinage Coalfield (Middle Ages – 1973)
- Campine Coalfield (1917–1992)
- Centre Coalfield (Middle Ages – 1973)
- Charleroi Coalfield (Middle Ages – 1984)
- Liege Coalfield (Middle Ages – 1980)

== Canada ==
- Ardley coalfield
- Beersville Coalfield
- Carbon-Thompson coalfield
- Comox Coalfield
- Crowsnest coalfield
- Cypress Coalfield
- Daly-Weaver coalfield
- Dominion coalfield
- Drumheller coalfield
- East Kootenay coalfield
- Elk Valley Coalfield
- Estevan Coalfield
- Flathead Coalfield
- Gething coalfield
- Hat Creek Coalfield
- Howley Coalfield
- Inverness Coalfield
- Joggins River Herbert Coalfield
- Lethbridge coalfield
- Mabou Coalfield
- MacKay coalfield
- Mannville coalfield
- Merritt Coalfield
- Minto Coalfield
- Nanaimo Coalfield
- Onakawana Coalfield
- Peace River coalfield
- Pictou Coalfield
- Princeton Coalfield
- St. George Coalfield
- St Rose-Chimney Corner Coalfield
- Spring Hill Coalfield
- Sydney Coalfield
- Taber coalfield
- Tulameen Coalfield
- Willow Bunch Coalfield
- Wood Mountain Coalfield

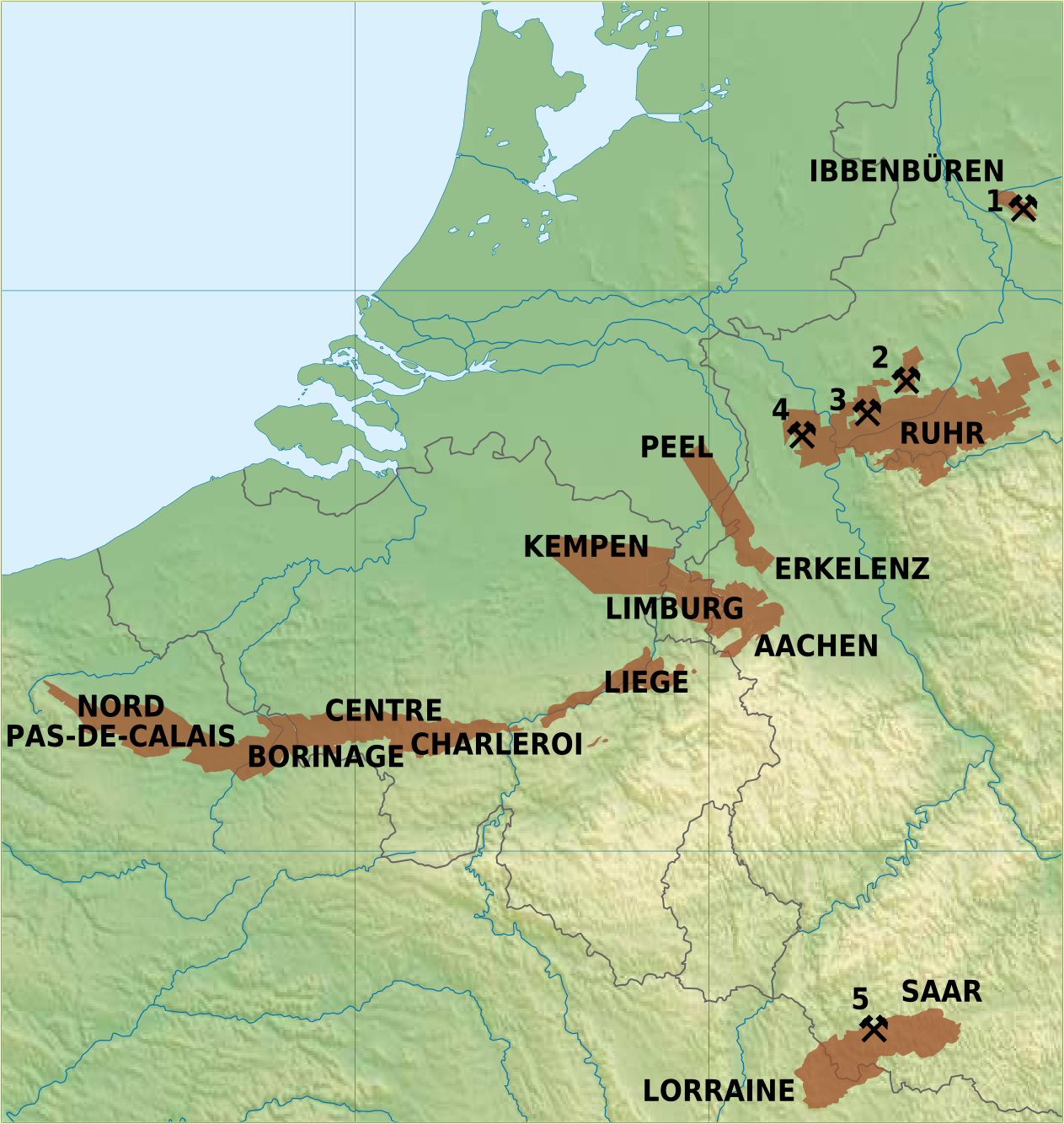
Coalfields of Germany, Belgium, the Netherlands and Northern France

== Chile ==
- Curanilahue Coalfield, Curanilahue, Bío Bío Region
- Boca Lebu Coalfield, Lebu, Bío Bío Region
- Lirquén Coalfield, Penco, Bío Bío Region
- Loreto Coalfield, Punta Arenas, Magallanes Region
- Lota Coalfield, Lota, Bío Bío Region
- Mulpún Coalfield, Mafil, Los Ríos Region
- Puchoco Coalfield, Coronel, Bío Bío Region

== China ==
- Juye coalfield
- Sha'er Lake coalfield
- Zhunggar coalfield

== Colombia ==
Colombia has the largest coal reserves in Latin America and is a major exporter.

- Cerrejón, in La Guajira
- Guajira coalfield

== France ==
- Aumance Coalfield
- Blanzy Coalfield
- Brassac Coalfield
- Carmaux Coalfield
- Champagnac Coalfield
- Dauphiné Coalfield
- Decazeville Coalfield
- Epinac Coalfield
- Gard Coalfield
- Hérault Coalfield
- Loire Coalfield
- Lorraine Coalfield (1820–2004)
- La Machine Coalfield
- Messeix Coalfield
- Nord-Pas-de-Calais Coalfield (1852–1990)
- Provence Coalfield
- St Eloi Coalfield

== Germany ==
- Aachen Coalfield

- Erkelenz Coalfield (1914–1997)
- Inde Coalfield (Middle Ages – 1944)
- Wurm Coalfield (Middle Ages – 1992)

- Ibbenbüren Coalfield (Middle Ages – 2018)
- Lugau-Oelsnitz Coalfield (1844–1971)
- Ruhr Coalfield (Middle Ages – 2018)
- Saar Coalfield (Middle Ages – 2012)
- Zwickau Coalfield (Middle Ages – 1979)

== Great Britain ==
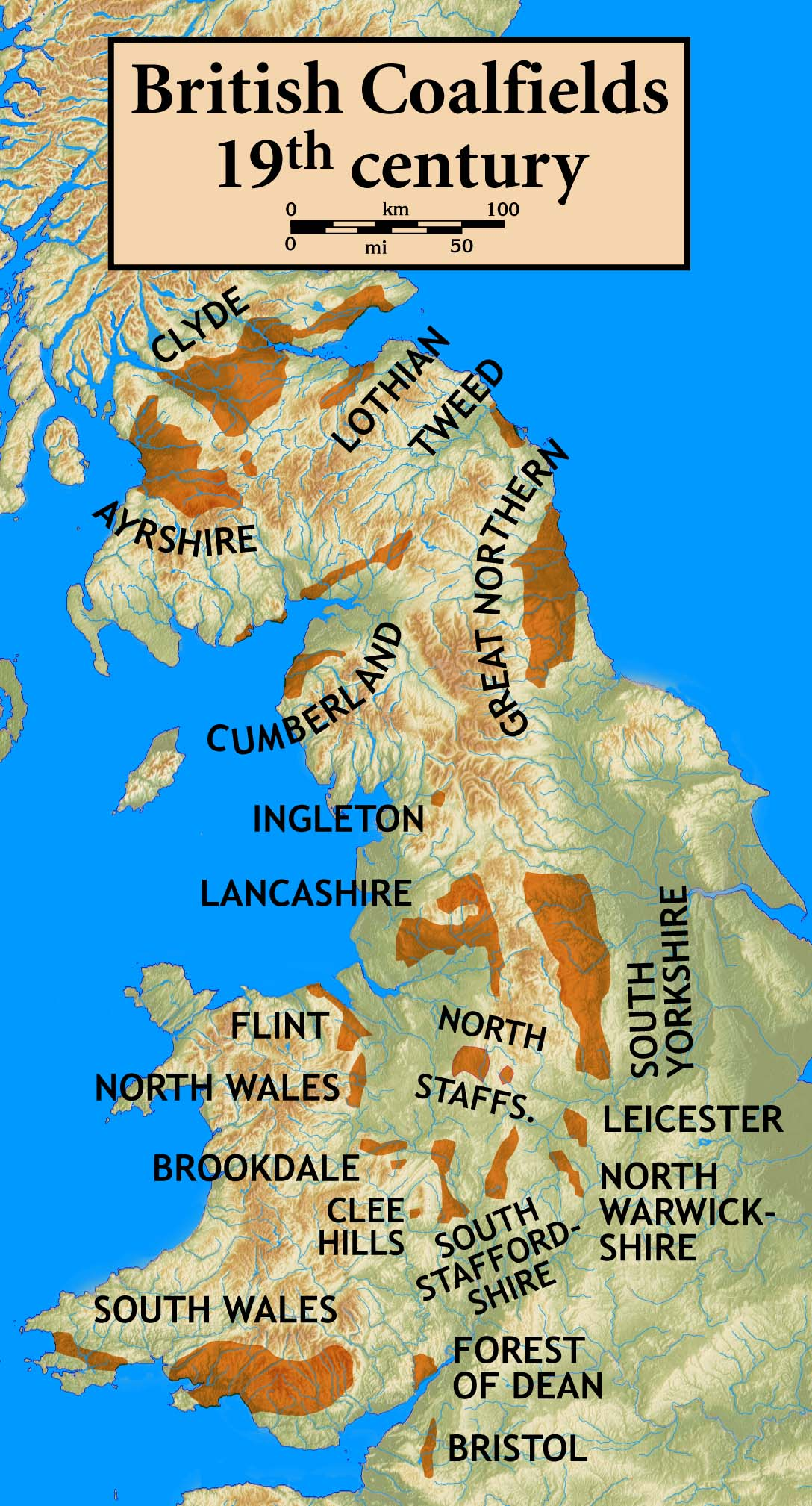

=== England ===
- Bristol Coalfield
- Cheadle Coalfield
- Clee Hills Coalfield
- Coalbrookdale Coalfield
- Cumberland Coalfield
- Durham Coalfield
- East Staffordshire Coalfield
- Forest of Dean Coalfield
- Ingleton Coalfield
- Kent Coalfield
- Lancashire Coalfield

- Burnley Coalfield
- South Lancashire Coalfield

- Cheshire Coalfield
- Manchester Coalfield
- Oldham Coalfield
- St Helens Coalfield
- Wigan Coalfield

- Leicestershire and South Derbyshire Coalfield
- Midgeholme Coalfield
- Newent Coalfield
- Oxfordshire-Berkshire Coalfield
- North Staffordshire Coalfield
- Northumberland Coalfield
- Nottinghamshire and Derbyshire Coalfield
- Oswestry Coalfield
- Shrewsbury Coalfield
- Shropshire Coalfield
- Somerset Coalfield
- South Staffordshire Coalfield
  - Cannock Chase Coalfield
- Warwickshire Coalfield
- Wyre Forest Coalfield
- Yorkshire Coalfield

- South Yorkshire Coalfield

=== Scotland ===
- Ayrshire Coalfield

- Central Ayrshire Coalfield
- South Ayrshire Coalfield

- Brora Coalfield
- Canonbie Coalfield
- Central Coalfield
- Clackmannan Coalfield
- Dailly Coalfield
- Douglas Coalfield
- Fife Coalfield

- Central Fife Coalfield
- East Fife Coalfield
- West Fife Coalfield

- Lanarkshire Coalfield
- Lothians Coalfield
- Machrihanish Coalfield
- Midlothian Coalfield
- Northeast Stirlingshire Coalfield
- Sanquhar Coalfield
- Scremerston Coalfield

=== Wales ===
- Anglesey Coalfield
- North Wales Coalfield

- Denbighshire Coalfield
- Flintshire Coalfield

- Pembrokeshire Coalfield
- South Wales Coalfield

== India ==
- Chirimiri Coalfield
- Daltonganj Coalfield
- Delhi-Jaipur Coalfield
- Deoghar Coalfield
- East Bokaro Coalfield
- Ib Valley Coalfield
- Jharia Coalfield
- Jhilimili Coalfield
- Kamptee Coalfield
- Korba Coalfield
- Makum Coalfield
- Mand Raigarh Coalfield
- Namchik-Namphuk Coalfield
- North Karanpura Coalfield
- Pench Kanhan Coalfield
- Rajmahal coalfield
- Ramgarh Coalfield
- Raniganj Coalfield
- Singrauli Coalfield
- Singareni Coalfield
- Sohagpur Coalfield
- South Eastern Coalfields
- South Karanpura Coalfield
- Talcher Coalfield
- Umaria Coalfield
- Wardha Valley Coalfield
- West Bokaro Coalfield

== Japan ==
=== Hokkaidō ===
- Ishikari coalfield
- Kayanuma coalfield
- Kushiro coalfield
- Rumoi coalfield
- Tenpoku coalfield

=== Honshū ===
- Jōban coalfield
- Omine coalfield
- Ube coalfield

=== Kyūshū ===
- Amakusa coalfield
- Chikuhō coalfield
- Miike coalfield
- Nishisonogi coalfield

== The Netherlands ==
- Limburg Coalfield (Middle Ages – 1974)
- Peel Coalfield (1955–1962)

== New Zealand ==
- Ashers-Waituna coalfield
- Rotowaro
- Stockton

== Pakistan ==
- Thar Coalfield

== Poland ==
- Lower Silesia Coalfield
- Lublin Coalfield
- Upper Silesian Coal Basin

== Russia ==
- Ulug-Khem coal basin

== South Africa ==
- Ermelo Coalfield
- Highveld Coalfield
- Klip River Coalfield
- Utrecht Coalfield
- Waterberg Coalfield
- Witbank Coalfield

== Ukraine ==
- Bogdanovskoye coalfield
- Dnieper Coalfield (lignite)
- Donets Coalfield, sometimes known by its misnomer Donetsk Coalfield
- Lviv-Volhynian Coalfield

== United States ==
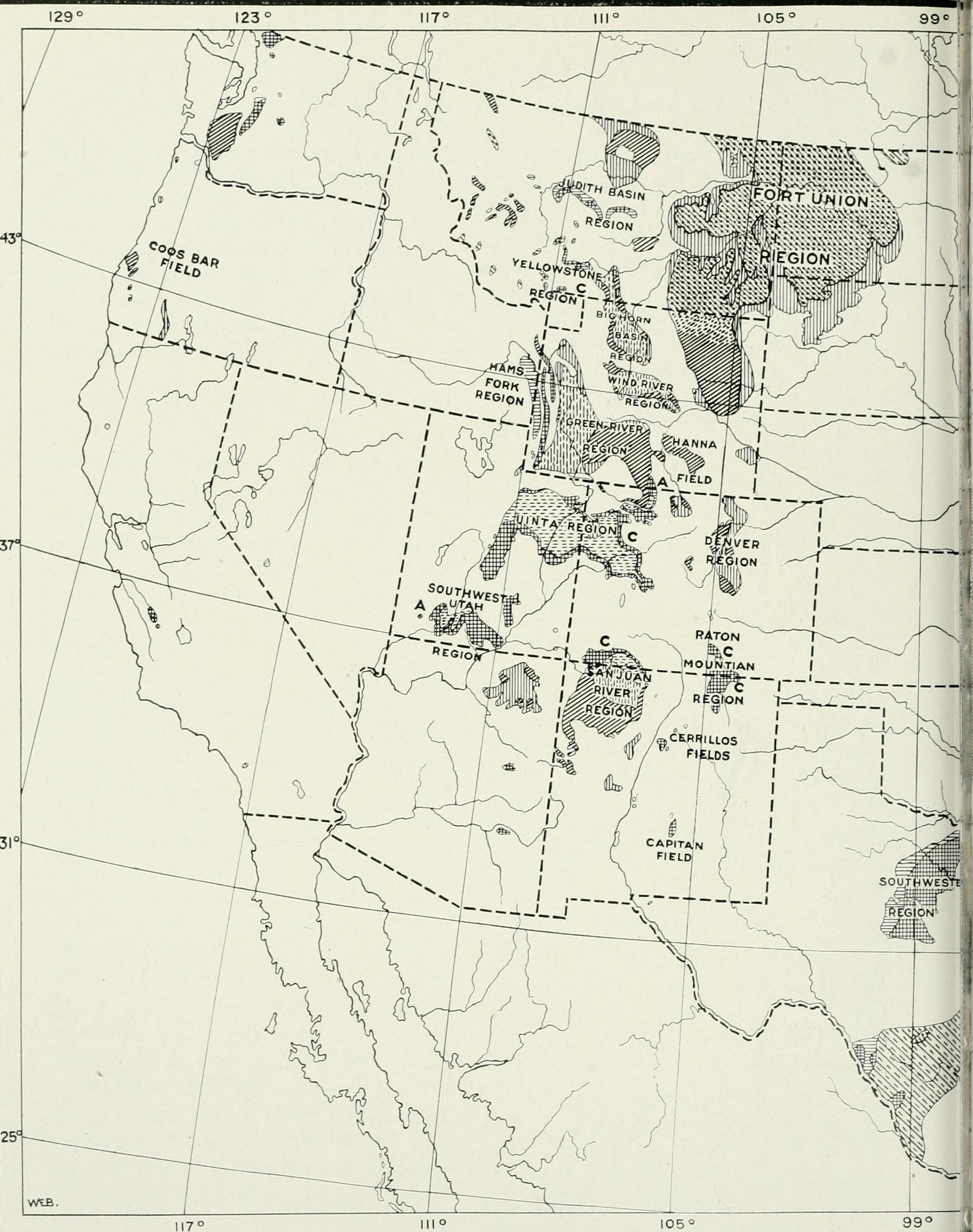
Coalfields in the West

=== Alabama ===
- Cahaba Coalfield
- Coosa Coalfield
- Lookout Mountain Coalfield
- Sand Mountain Coalfield
- Warrior Coalfield

=== Alaska ===
- Nenana Coalfield

=== Arkansas ===
- Arkansas Valley Coalfield

=== Colorado ===
- Book Cliffs Coalfield
- Boulder-Weld Coalfield
- Canyon City Coalfield
- Colorado Springs Coalfield
- Crested Butte Coalfield
- Dan Forth Hills Coalfield
- Durango Coalfield
- Grand Hogback Coalfield
- Grand Mesa Coalfield
- North Park Coalfield
- Nucla Naturita Coalfield
- Pagosa Springs Coalfield
- Somerset Colorado Coalfield
- South Park Coalfield
- Trinidad Coalfield
- Yampa Coalfield

=== Illinois ===
- Harrisburg Coalfield
- Southern Illinois

=== Indiana ===
- Southwestern Indiana

=== Iowa ===
- Appanoose-Wayne Coalfield
- Eldora Coalfield
- Fort Dodge Coalfield
- Walnut Creek Coalfield

=== Kansas ===
- Pittsburg-Weir Coalfield

=== Kentucky ===
- Cincinnati-Southern Coalfield
- Cumberland Gap Coalfield
- Elkhorn Coalfield
- Harlan Coalfield
- Hazard Coalfield
- Jellico Coalfield
- Kenova Coalfield
- Paintsville Coalfield
- Thacker Coalfield
- West Kentucky Coalfield

=== Maryland ===
- Cassellman Coalfield
- Georges Creek Coalfield
- Lower Youghiogheny Coalfield
- Upper Potomac Coalfield
- Upper Youghiogheny Coalfield

=== North Carolina ===
- Dan River Coalfield
- Deep River Coalfield

=== Ohio ===
- Amsterdam-Salineville Coalfield
- Cambridge Coalfield
- Coshocton Coalfield
- Crooksville Coalfield
- Federal Creek Coalfield
- Goshen Coalfield
- Hocking Coalfield
- Ironton Coalfield
- Jackson Coalfield
- Lisbon Coalfield
- Massillion Coalfield
- Meigs Creek Coalfield
- Palmyra Coalfield
- Pittsburgh No. 8 Coalfield
- Pomeroy Coalfield

=== Oklahoma ===
- Arkoma Basin Coalfield
- Northeastern Shelf Coalfield
- Oklahoma Coalfield

=== Oregon ===
- Coos Bay Coalfield

=== Pennsylvania ===
- Anthracite Coalfield (Coal Region)
- Beaver Coalfield
- Bennetts Branch Coalfield
- Bernice Coalfield
- Black Lick Coalfield (aka Nanto Glo Coalfield)
- Blossburg Coalfield
- Broad Top Coalfield
- Butler Coalfield
- Cameron Coalfield
- Clarion Coalfield
- Clearfield Coalfield
- Connellsville Coalfield
- Freeport Coalfield
- Georges Creek Coalfield
- Indian Valley Coalfield
- Indiana Coalfield
- Irwin Gas Coalfield
- Keating Coalfield
- Kittanning Coalfield
- Klondike Coalfield
- Ligonier Coalfield
- Low Grade Division Coalfield
- Mercer Coalfield
- Meyersdale Coalfield
- Moshannon Coalfield
- Mountain Coalfield
- Pittsburgh Coalfield
- Punxsutawney Coalfield
- Ralston Coalfield
- Shawmut Coalfield
- Snowshoe Coalfield
- Somerset Pennsylvania Coalfield
- Westmoreland Coalfield
- Windber Coalfield

=== Tennessee ===
- Cumberland Gap Coalfield
- Jellico Coalfield
- Lafollette Coalfield
- Rockwood Coalfield
- Soddy Coalfield
- Wartburg Coalfield

=== Utah ===
- Blacktail Coalfield
- Book Cliffs Coalfield
- Castlegate Coalfield
- Coalville Coalfield
- Emery Coalfield
- Harmony Coalfield
- Henry Mountains Coalfield
- Kaiporonitis Plateau Coalfield
- Kolob Plateau Coalfield
- Sunnyside Coalfield
- Teton Basin Coalfield
- Vernal Coalfield
- Wasatch Plateau

=== Virginia ===
- Buchanan Coalfield
- Clinch Valley Coalfield
- Pocahontas Coalfield
- Richmond Coalfield
- Southwestern Coalfield (Big Stone Gap Coalfield)
- Valley Coalfield (anthracite)

=== West Virginia ===
- Elkins Coalfield
- Fairmont Coalfield
- Greenbrier Coalfield
- Kanawha Coalfield
- Logan Coalfield
- Meadow Branch Coalfield (anthracite)
- New River Coalfield
- Panhandle Coalfield
- Pocahontas Coalfield
- Upper Potomac Coalfield
- Williamson Coalfield
- Winding Gulf Coalfield

=== Wyoming ===
- Bighorn Coalfield
- Black Hills Coalfield
- Goshen Hole Coalfield
- Green River Coalfield
- Hams Fork Coalfield
- Hanna Coalfield
- Jackson Hole Coalfield
- Powder River Coalfield (aka Gillette Coalfield)
- Rock Creek Coalfield
- Wind River Coalfield

== Venezuela ==
- Guasare coalfield

== See also ==
- List of oil fields
- Major coal producing regions
