= Fife Coal Company =

Scottish coal mining company

- Successor: National Coal Board
- Formation: September 1872; 153 years ago
- Dissolved: 1946; 80 years ago
- Headquarters: Leven, Fife
- Products: coal, ironstone, bricks
- Chairman: William Lindsay (1872–1884); Thomas Aitken (1884–1907); Charles Carlow (1907–?); C. Augustus Carlow (?–1946)

The Fife Coal Company was formed in 1872 to acquire the small Beath and Blairadam Colliery with its pits in Kelty. Its head office was in Leven. In addition to coal, the company worked some ironstone. For the whole of its operating life, the company was run by Charles Carlow and then his son C. Augustus Carlow. Output was expanded from an initial 70,000 tons a year to 4.3m. in 1911. Although it became the largest coal company in Scotland, Fife Coal never regained that level of output in the inter-war period.

== History ==
=== Expansion ===
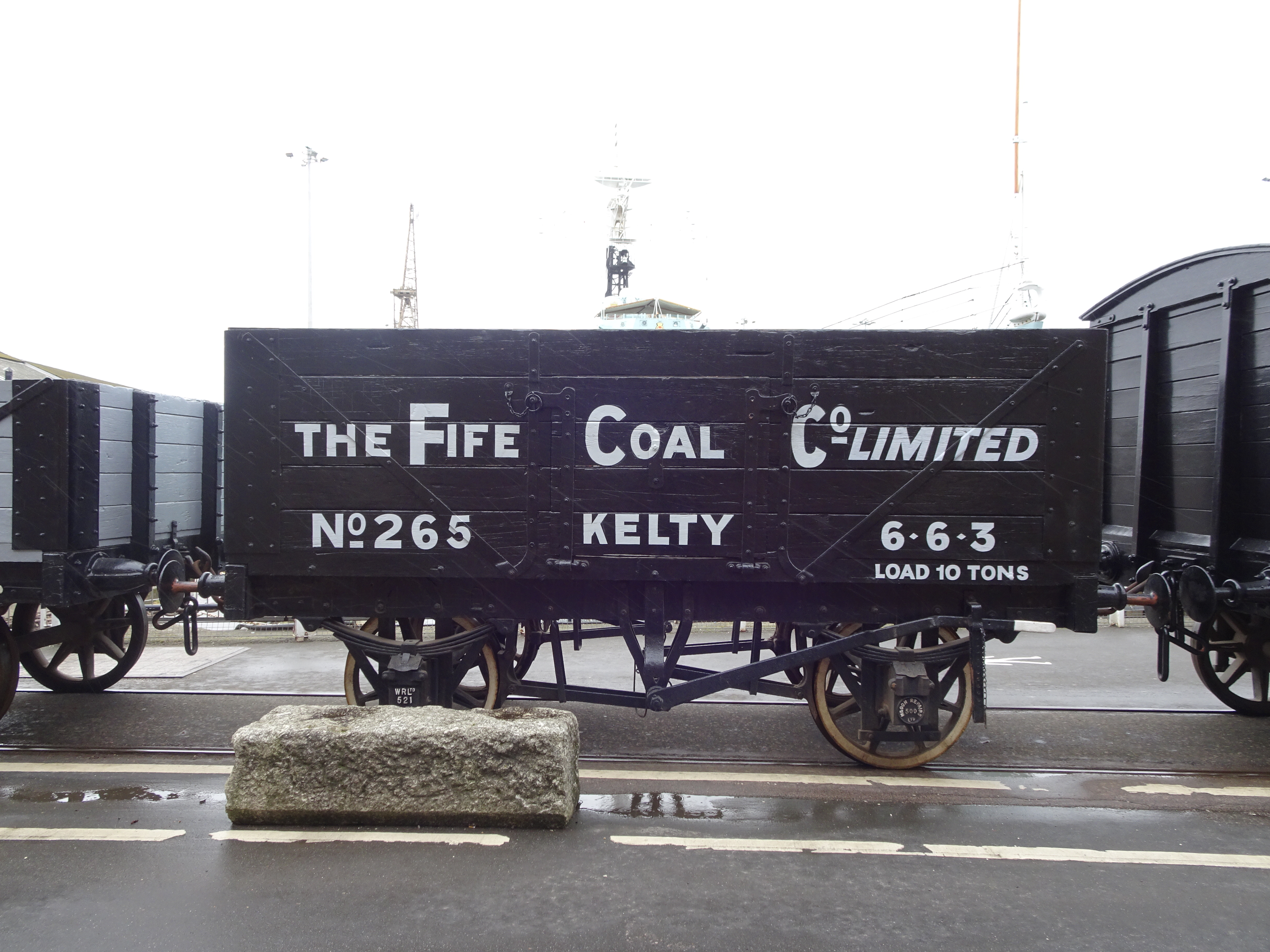
Fife Coal Company wagon

The first meeting of the directors was held in Edinburgh in September 1872, under the chairmanship of William Lindsay, a shipowner and Lord Provost of Leith. It was resolved to form a new company and for £22,000 to buy the Beath and Blairadam Colliery which held a number of small pits in Kelty, in Fife. Shares were allotted in January 1873 and the task of modernising the Kelty pits and the construction of new collieries began. Given their ambitions, the directors decided they needed a new managerial leader and recruited the 24-year-old Charles Carlow from a neighbouring colliery. Carlow ran the company for the next fifty years, as general manager, director and chairman. Carlow married Lindsay's daughter Mary. On his death, his son succeeded him and remained chairman until nationalisation.

The early years were difficult: the coal price fell, the coal seams were of poor quality, and the company money. One of the first steps was to prove the value of the lower coal seams and work began on what was to become the high-quality seams of the Lindsay Colliery. The management also looked for more profitable coalfields and in 1876 leased the Methil field, financed by a loan from the British Linen Bank. The Leven fields were bought (with the company's office moving there) followed by the Pirnie colliery. By 1878 the company returned to profit. The new fields substantially increased output, reaching nearly 300,000 tons in 1884 compared to 79,000 tons in 1872. At home, there were contracts with gas and rail companies and abroad the company was exporting to France, Netherlands and San Francisco. A continued process of adding fields, taking leases and sinking new pits took output up to 794,000 tons in 1893.

Labour troubles were never far away in the coal mining industry. A particular source of difficulty was over labour rates which typically varied with the price of coal, and a four-month strike in 1894 cost the company around 150,000 tons of output. This did not prevent further substantial physical expansion. The Aitken Colliery was started in 1893 and this would soon become the largest in Scotland with an eventual output of 500,000 tons a year. In 1896, the company acquired the pits of Cowdenbeath Coal, nine in total, making the company one of the largest coal-mining concerns in Scotland. By 1900 output reached 2m. tons and there were more than 5,000 employees. The increasing scale of the company's output meant a need to further expand its exports.

The first half of the 1900s saw the acquisition of four smaller collieries but the most important event was the sinking of the Mary pit on the recently purchased Lochore estate, with its eventual output of 250,000 tons a year. With the absorption of eight further companies, it had become the largest operator in the field in Fife by 1909. The increasing output from these newer large pits, together with purchase of the Donibristle Colliery in 1908 and Bowhill in 1909, doubled output in a decade, reaching 4.4m. tons in 1911, with 14,500 employees. By 1913, it was the largest mining industry employer in Scotland and the third-largest in the United Kingdom. The company was now responsible for almost half of the Fife Coalfield output but this proved to be its peak.

=== The Inter-war Years ===
If the period from its formation to World War I had been one of almost uninterrupted growth, the inter-war years was a more troubled time and output never regained its former levels. The First World War was a major disruption. A quarter of its workforce joined the military, affecting production. On the sales side, half of its coal output had been exported and this halved by the end of 1915. In March 1916, the government took control of all the collieries in the county and this was not relinquished until after the war. In 1920 the coal industry hit a “high wave of prosperity” with “exports at unprecedented prices”. This was short-lived and 1921 saw a slump in prices; coal owners lost money and pressurised miners to accept lower wages, leading to a national dispute. “Fife collieries suffered badly at the hands of the extremists” as even safety men were called out. Pumping was suspended and the damage from flooding meant that some pits took months to recover after the ending of the dispute. Fife Coal's output fell by a million tons.

Charles Carlow died in January 1923, succeeded by Augustus Carlow as managing director. But there was no immediate change to the company's expansionary plans. In that same year, the Earl of Rosslyn’s collieries, with a potential output of 500,000 tons, was bought, followed by Oakley Collieries in 1924. That proved to be the last purchase. The British coal industry faced increasing problems in its export markets in the face of competition from France, Germany and Poland, all with lower wages. The lack of competitiveness was exacerbated in April 1925 by the return to the gold standard at a high valuation for sterling. Fife Coal itself was losing money and the pressure on the miners to accept lower wages culminated in the miners strike at the beginning of May 1926. Two days later the TUC called a general strike in support of the miners. After nine days the general strike was called off but the miners struggled on until November.

Fife Coal was still losing money well into 1927 but foreign competition began to wane and in 1929 exports reached 2.5m tons out of total output of almost 4m. tons – the highest since 1913. This did not last long and the start of the depression in 1930 led to pit closures and a substantial fall in profits. There was a recognition that the company needed to operate on more productive seams. Work began in 1935 at Comrie with belief that it could produce 1m tons a year. (It eventually came on stream in 1940). WWII meant the almost total loss of the company's export markets. On the advent of peace, there was a substantial recovery of output to 3m tons in 1946, and the Fife Coal Company claimed to be the largest coal mining company in Scotland. Long-term plans were for an ambitious increase in output to 6.25m. tons by the early 1960s but this was soon overtaken by the nationalisation plans of the Labour Government. On the last day of 1946 the company was disestablished and the mining property and assets of Fife Coal were transferred to the National Coal Board the next day. The company was wound up in 1952.

== See also ==
- Fife and Kinross Miners' Association
