= Anthony Henday =

English explorer

- Born: Isle of Wight, England
- Occupation: Explorer
- Years active: 1750–62

Anthony Henday (fl. c. 1725–1762) was one of the first Europeans to explore the interior of what would eventually become western Canada. He ventured farther into the interior of western Canada than any European had before him. As an employee of the Hudson's Bay Company, he travelled across the prairies in the 1750s, journeyed into what is now central Alberta, and possibly arrived at the present site of Red Deer. He camped along the North Saskatchewan River, perhaps on the present site of Rocky Mountain House or Edmonton, and is said to have been the first European to see the Rocky Mountains, if only from a distance.

In 1754, he and his group came to what is now Alberta with a mission to meet the Blackfoot and encourage them to trade with the Hudson's Bay Company. They travelled some 2,900 kilometres (1,800 mi) by canoe and some 1,400 kilometres (900 mi) by foot. Henday and his group travelled 1,400 kilometres (900 mi) to within sight of the mighty Rocky Mountains and back another 1,400 kilometres (900 mi) in just six days less than a year.

His purpose was to encourage First Nations in the upper watershed of the Saskatchewan River to come to Hudson Bay to trade, but the great distance involved, their inability to build canoes and paddle them, and fear of attack by Cree and Assiniboine along the river caused Blackfoot and other western prairie First Nations to be reluctant to make the journey.

== Early life ==
Henday was from the Isle of Wight, England. He may have been baptised in Shorwell on 24 December 1725.

== Hudson's Bay Company ==
A convicted smuggler, Henday joined the Hudson's Bay Company (HBC) in 1750 as a net-maker and labourer. Being described by company officials as being "bold and enterprising".

From the 1600s to the late 1800s the HBC had the right to exclusive fur trade within the Hudson Bay watershed. This region was known as Rupert's Land. For the furs that HBC desired they wanted to trade commodities such as tobacco, kettles, axes, mirrors, beads, and alcohol.

The HBC was concerned that La Vérendrye and other French entrepreneurs were funnelling the fur trade from Rupert's Land away from the English posts at Hudson Bay. Eventually, James Isham, chief factor at York Fort, suggested an expedition to the western Prairies to encourage First Nations to trade at Hudson Bay. The HBC authorized and funded Henday to explore the interior of what is now western Canada, using York Factory as his base.

On June 26, 1754, Henday, Attickasish (a Cree man able to interpret for Henday in communicating with Natives of the western prairies), and several other Cree set out on foot to travel from York Factory westward, crossing present-day Manitoba and Saskatchewan, and entering today's Alberta. His route is not clear. It is variously thought he travelled as far west as present-day Red Deer, Balermo, Innisfail, Stettler, Eckville, or the Calgary area – all or only some of those places. (The Rockies are visible from Calgary and could be what he referred to when he wrote about "shining hills.")

A conjecture of Henday's route in detail was formulated and presented to the public by L. J. Burpee in 1907, under the name "York Factory to the Blackfeet Country." Using the HBC Journals as his source, Burpee had the explorer's name as Hendry. He supposed that Henday passed through Walker Lake (which Henday called Christineaux Lake), not Lake Winnipeg as is sometimes supposed, then up the Minago River to Moose Lake, then to the Saskatchewan River, and travelling past the French trading post of Fort Basqua (The Pas). Henday's visit, and his visit the next spring to Fort Basqua's sister fort, Fort Poskoyac (La Corne), are the only two recorded visits by a British explorer or trader to any French fort west of Lake Superior, up to the close of French rule in Canada.

Burpee supposed that Henday got as far west as about Airdrie (from which the Rockies are visible) in the autumn of 1754. Turning north he spent February, March and April along today's Red Deer River, building canoes. When the ice broke up in the spring, he paddled down the Red Deer to where it joins the South Saskatchewan just east of today's Empress, Alberta, and then down the South Saskatchewan River, then the Saskatchewan River, back to York Factory.

It is documented Henday's group passed the French Fort Paskoya "Pasqua"/"Basquia" or "Paskoway Yay," today's The Pas, on July 15, 1754, as recorded in his journal. There he may have met La Corne, the western commander, or likely did the next spring on his way back to York Factory.

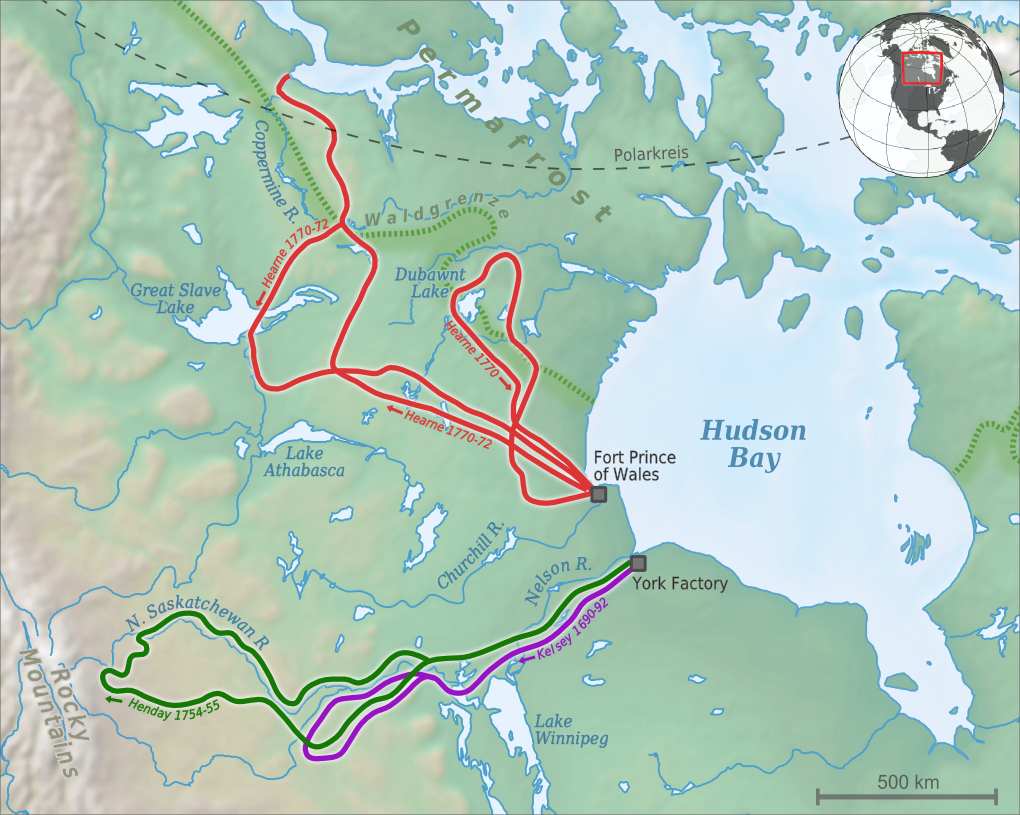
Anthony Henday's route in green.

Burpee postulated that Henday crossed the South Saskatchewan River (what Henday noted his Cree companions called Wapasewcopet seepee) on August 21, 1754, likely near the later site of Clarke's Crossing.

On September 10, 1754, Henday and his party camped approximately 29 kilometres (18 mi) north-east of where Chauvin is located today, quite possibly at Sherlock Lake. The following day, September 11, he crossed over from Saskatchewan into present-day Alberta. On October 11, he arrived at Waskesew River, perhaps the Red Deer River. Waskesew is an anglicization of the Cree word (Plains Cree: wâwâskêsiw, Woods Cree: wâwâskîsiw) for the elk or wapiti. In Cree the Red Deer River is called wâwâskêsiw-sîpiy.

Henday may not have been aware that the Blackfoot and the Cree were enemies. There is some indication in Henday's journal entries that his Cree companions were wary of the people they and Henday encountered as their journey progressed into present-day south-central Alberta. Henday encountered what he called "Asinepoets" (thought by some to be Assiniboines) on September 20 and "Archithinues" (the Blackfoot or other group of the Blackfoot Confederacy) on September 29. Henday was told these people had never been in contact with any Europeans. He noted that his Cree companions were afraid of them. That the Archithinues were riding horses was a surprising revelation, and when Henday reported it upon his return to civilization, the report was disbelieved.

On October 14, Henday arrived at a massive Archithinues (Blackfoot) encampment that by Henday's count numbered 322 tepees sited on the top of a hill. The 322-teepee encampment is thought to have been located a few miles west of Pine Lake, near present-day Innisfail. (A cairn in Henday's honour was erected there later.)

The tent or teepee of the "king" was large enough to hold 50 people, Henday reported. Henday was invited into that tent and smoked a peace pipe with the "king" and 20 elders. Through his interpreter Attickasish, he imparted the purpose of his mission. Henday invited some of the Archithinues go with them back to York Factory. The Archithinue leader turned down the offer, explaining that his people did not paddle canoes and that York Factory was too far away. The leader of the Archithinue, probably, knew that his people would be travelling uninvited through Cree territory and would risk being killed by Cree or other enemies. Henday urged the residents there to build up their stocks of fur by going into the woods to hunt and trap, but he reported that they instead preferred to take their ease, staying in camp and "enjoying their primitive entertainment of drumming and conjuring."

Henday himself did not explore further west, but over the next few autumn and winter months, made short journeys in the area just to get provisions and furs.

After receiving an indefinite answer from the Blackfoot leader (which Henday took as a "no"), Henday returned to York Factory with news he had explored the area and met with the Blackfoot. Since the answer had been unsure and because Henday's trip did not subsequently produce any large increase in furs arriving at York Factory, there were few expeditions to what would eventually be Alberta in the late 1700s. (Matthew Cocking covered some of the same ground as Henday in 1772.) Instead the fur trade gradually built westward to a point where there were posts built inside Alberta, such as Buckingham House and Acton House, both built near Elk Point in 1792, and the first Fort Edmonton being built in 1795. Peter Fidler travelled through central Alberta in 1792, definitively mapping the location of rivers and lakes, many of which Henday had likely visited 40 years earlier.

Others postulate that in the spring of 1755 Henday set off to return to York Factory by going north to the North Saskatchewan River from which to proceed downriver and eastward. They state that on March 3, 1755, he reached the North Saskatchewan at the mouth of the Sturgeon River near present-day Fort Saskatchewan. “Here he camped while canoes were made and more fur-laden Indians arrived. When the ice left the river, a brigade of 70 canoes started downstream-but Henday's woes were not over. At the French forts of La Corne and Paskoya, gifts of brandy from residents there persuaded the Indians to trade most of their prime furs, and they were lost to Henday's company” He celebrated St. George's Day (April 23). Some say that day he was at the mouth of the Sturgeon Creek; he may have been at the mouth of a river entering the North Saskatchewan River west of Edmonton; others say he was where Tail Creek joins the Red Deer River.

He set off downriver on April 27. If he was on the North Saskatchewan River, the place of embarkation may or may not have been upriver of present-day Edmonton.

Henday arrived at Fort Paskoya "Pasqua" or "Paskoway Yay" on May 26 and York Fort on June 23.

As Henday travelled inland to the Blackfoot country and back to York Factory, he talked about the First Nations having problems with alcohol. He mentions on one day that his whole company was unable to travel because everyone was drinking. On 30 May 1755 Henday remarked in his journal that he is unable to continue their travels back to York Factory because his First Nations companions "drank too much" He also noted ruefully that they were trading their best furs to the French in exchange for alcohol.

This trip, and later ones, took Henday across much of the prairies of what is now Saskatchewan and Alberta.

There is great uncertainty of his route – his original journal of his trip and any notes in his own hand cannot be found. His journal was copied by others in four different and contradictory versions. His trip as presented in the four versions cannot always be put in a modern context, due to there being no landmarks he identified that are still extant today.

He does record sighting what is thought to be the Rockies, which the Natives he met called "Arsinie Watchie." "Had a fine view of Arsinie Watchie at a far distance, it being the last sight that I ever shall have of it this year." (Henday's Journal, 1754, Dec. 24, 1754). But the Native term and Henday himself could have been referring to a series of high hills, not in fact to the majestic mountains.

The puzzle is further deepened by the fact that one version of his journal states (Oct. 29, 1754): "I had a fine prospect of Muscuty or Arsinee Warchee Country, and seed the Archithinues smoak; this will be the time I shall see that delightful country this trip inland."

But it is evident that he brought much trade to York Factory.

Henday left the service of the HBC in 1762 largely because his efforts for the company, at least in his estimation, had not been properly recognized.

== Legacy ==
Historians commenting on Henday's brave journey write that “there is no feat in all the story of Northwestern travel that surpasses this” and that “His trip led to further development of the West for it gave his company a new outlook.”

Anthony Henday Drive, a large ring road in Edmonton, is named in his honour, as is Henday Hall, one of the residence towers in the main student residence complex at the University of Alberta in that city.

== See also ==
- Ardley coalfield
