= Richmond Coalfield =

First commercial coalfield in the USA

Coordinates: 37°30′N 77°40′W

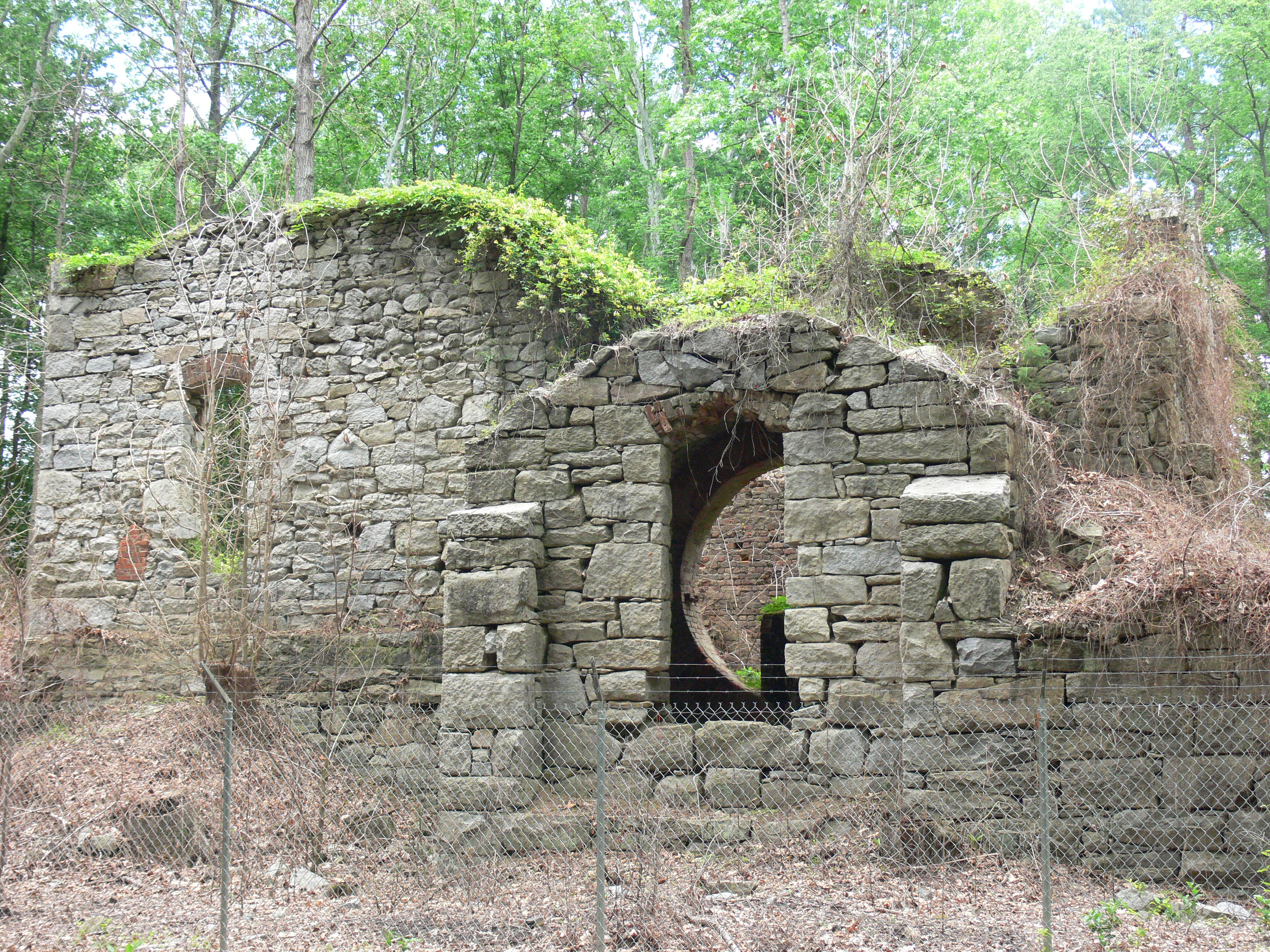
Ruins of the ventilation house for the Grove Shaft, Midlothian, Virginia

The Richmond Coalfield was the first coalfield to be mined commercially in the United States of America. The coalfield is located several miles west of the city of Richmond, Virginia. Its bituminous coal seams are a part of the Richmond Basin, dating to the Late Triassic.

Discovered around 1701, commercial production began around 1748. Production was centered in the village of Midlothian, Virginia, established to serve the various mines in the area. With the rise of numerous coalfields in Appalachia, in particular the Pocahontas Coalfield in Western Virginia, coupled with the difficulties in mining the field, the mines eventually closed by 1927. Overall production is estimated at more than 8,000,000 short tons (7,300,000 t).

== Geology of Richmond Basin ==
Richmond Basin
- Stratigraphic range: Late Triassic
- Type: Sedimentary basin
- Unit of: Newark Supergroup
- Sub-units: Chesterfield Group; Tuckahoe Group

Lithology
- Primary: Sandstone
- Other: conglomerate, shale, bituminous coal

Location
- Region: Piedmont
- Country: United States
- Extent: 190 miles (310 km)

Type section
- Named for: Richmond, Virginia

The Richmond Basin is a Late Triassic sedimentary basin, located west of Richmond, Virginia. It is one of several Eastern North America Rift Basins dating to the Mesozoic era, forming the Newark Supergroup. Fossils of the Euscolosuchus were first discovered in the basin.

The basin extends across parts of Henrico County, Goochland County, Powhatan County, Chesterfield County, Amelia County, and Dinwiddie County, with the majority in Chesterfield.

== Mining ==
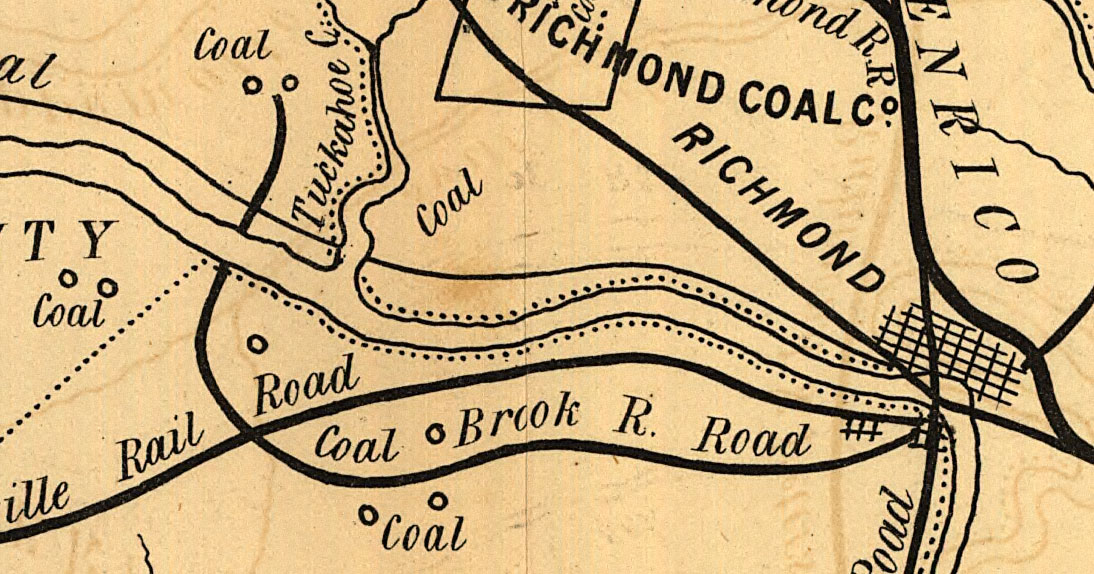
1856 map showing the Chesterfield gravity railway, with locations of coal mines indicated

As early as 1701, the coal deposits of the Richmond Coalfield were known to settlers, discovered by French Huguenots who settled in the Manakintown area. Coal had previously been discovered in the 17th century in what is now Illinois.

The first recorded coal production from the Richmond coalfield, and what would become the United States, dates to 1748. 50 short tons (45 t) were recorded mined that year.

By the end of the 18th century, coal mined in the field was being shipped to Philadelphia, New York City, and Boston, where it was sold well into the mid-19th century.

Major companies involved included: Black Heath, Midlothian, Clover Hill, etc.

During the American Civil War, the mines supplied coal and coke for the Tredegar Ironworks in Richmond. In May 1864, Union Army officer August Kautz lead a cavalry raid targeting the Richmond and Danville Railway through Chesterfield County. After the destruction of the nearby railway station, one of the mines was tentatively ordered to be lit on fire by Col. Samuel P. Spear, though the order was soon rescinded.

=== Accidents ===
The various mines suffered numerous explosions and fires. On February 3, 1882, the Grove Shaft exploded; the destruction was such that it was reported in the New York Times the next day.

== Legacy ==
As a result of the significance of coal mining in the area's early history, a miner resting on a pick is in the center of the seal for Chesterfield County, Virginia. Various place names remain from the era or were adopted later, including Coalfield Road. In the early 2000s, the remains of the Grove Shaft were preserved as part of the Mid-Lothian Mines Park, part of the county's public parks system.

== See also ==
- History of coal mining in the United States
- History of coal miners
