= Bogdanovskoye coalfield =

Coal field in Donetsk, Ukraine

Location
- Location: Donetsk Oblast, Ukraine

Production
- Products: Coal

The Bogdanovskoye is a large coal field located in the east of Ukraine in Donetsk Oblast. Bogdanovskoye represents one of the largest coal reserve in Ukraine having estimated reserves of 3.5 billion tonnes of coal.

== See also ==
- List of coalfields
- Coal in Ukraine
