= Daly-Weaver coalfield =

Coal field in Alberta, Canada

Location
- Location: Alberta, Canada

Production
- Products: Coal

The Daly-Weaver is a large coal field located in the western part of Canada in Alberta. Daly-Weaver represents one of the largest coal reserve in Canada having estimated reserves of 178 billion tonnes of coal.

== See also ==
- Coal in Alberta
- List of coalfields
