= Crowsnest coalfield =

Coal mine in British Columbia, Canada

Location
- Location: British Columbia, Canada

Production
- Products: Coal

The Crowsnest is a large coal field located in the west of Canada in British Columbia. Crowsnest represents one of the largest coal reserve in Canada having estimated reserves of 25 billion tonnes of coal.

== See also ==
- List of coalfields
