= Dominion coalfield =

Location
- Location: British Columbia, Canada

Production
- Products: Coal

The Dominion is a large coal field located in the west of Canada in British Columbia. Dominion represents one of the largest coal reserve in Canada having estimated reserves of 8.6 billion tonnes of coal.

== See also ==
- List of coalfields
