= Dan River Coalfield =

Coalfield in North Carolina, United States

Coordinates: 36.434°N 80.248°W

The Dan River Coalfield is a coalfield in Stokes and Rockingham counties, North Carolina about which, in 1914, USGS geologist R.W. Stone wrote, "after a thorough and careful examination of the Triassic beds in the Dan River Field the conclusion is reached that there is no reason to expect to find commercially valuable coal beds in this district." This correlated with the information that the North Carolina Geological and Economic Survey had about the Dan River Field, and thus it has remained an unimportant coalfield to this day. Yet a slope portal was once driven into the 4-foot-thick (1.2 m) semi-bituminous coal at Leaksville, NC, and Ebenezer Emmons wrote, "The coal is less pure than that of Deep River, but it will probably prove a valuable fuel for warming apartments by means of stoves and grates." Actually about 30 miles of this coal deposit exist in North Carolina and another 10 project into neighboring Virginia.
