= Brora Coalfield =

Coal mining region in northern Scotland

Coordinates: 58.011°N 3.866°W

The Brora Coalfield is a coalfield on the east coast of Sutherland in northern Scotland. The 'Brora Main' is a 1m to 1.5m thick seam which has been mined in the Brora area. It is unusual amongst British coalfields in being of Jurassic age rather than Carboniferous. The first seams to be worked were those exposed along the North Sea coast though inland mining began in the early nineteenth century. Mining continued until the 1970s; its principal market being the nearby brickworks.
