= Mannville coalfield =

- Location: Alberta, Canada
- Products: Coal

The Mannville is a large coal field located in the western part of Canada in Alberta. Mannville represents one of the largest coal reserve in Canada having estimated reserves of 570 billion tonnes of coal.

== See also ==
- List of coalfields
