= Lethbridge coalfield =

- Location: Alberta, Canada
- Products: Coal

The Lethbridge is a large coal field located in the western part of Canada in Alberta. Lethbridge represents one of the largest coal reserve in Canada having estimated reserves of 277 billion tonnes of coal.

== See also ==
- List of coalfields
