= Charles Augustus Carlow =

Scottish mining engineer (1878 - 1954)

Charles Augustus Carlow FRSE
- Born: 30 November 1878; Leven, Fife, Scotland
- Died: 13 August 1954 (aged 75); St Andrews, Fife, Scotland
- Education: Heriot-Watt College; University of Edinburgh
- Occupations: Mining engineer, businessman, philanthropist
- Known for: Owner of Fife Coal Company
- Relatives: William Lindsay (maternal grandfather); Sir William Reid (cousin)

Charles Augustus Carlow FRSE (30 November 1878 – 13 August 1954) was a Scottish mining engineer and owner and managing director of the Fife Coal Company Ltd., that was based in Leven, Fife.

== Life ==
Carlow was born at 2 Links Place in Leven, Fife on 30 November 1878 to Mary Weatherstone (née Lindsay; 1851-1929), daughter of William Lindsay, a shipowner, and Charles Carlow (1849-1923) a mining engineer. He studied mining technology at Heriot-Watt College and the University of Edinburgh.

In 1952 he was awarded an honorary doctorate (LLD) from the University of St Andrews. He died in St Andrews in Fife on 13 August 1954.

== Family ==
He was the maternal grandson of William Lindsay FRSE (1819-1884).

He was first cousin to Sir Charles Carlow Reid co-author with his son, Sir William Reid of the "Reid Report" on the state of British coal-mining.

== Benefactions ==
In 1927 he gave Blair House and 27 acres of ground near Culross in Fife to serve as a convalescent home for elderly and injured miners. The home is named for him as Charles Carlow Miners Convalescent Home.

== Positions held ==
See

- Deputy Lieutenant of Fife.
- Managing Director of the Fife Coal Company Ltd
- Chairman of Shotts Iron Company
- Chairman of Fife and Clackmannan Coal Owners Association
- President of the Institute of Mining Engineers
- President of the Mining Institute of Scotland
- Fellow of the Institute of Fuel
- Fellow of the Royal Society of Edinburgh
- President of the Association of Mining Electrical Engineers
- Chairman of the Transport Committee of Scottish Coal Owners
