= Meadow Branch Coalfield =

Coordinates: 39°32′N 78°05′W

The Meadow Branch Coalfield is a coalfield located in the Eastern Panhandle of West Virginia along the Berkeley and Morgan county lines.

It is the only anthracite coalfield in West Virginia, unlike the bituminous coal found in the rest of the state. It has not seen any active mining in many decades. However, as early as 1798 anthracite from Berkeley County and bituminous coal from Mineral County were the sources of coal supplying the government's Harpers Ferry Armory. Berkeley County was also a source of coal during the American Civil War. The last mining occurred in the early 20th century; the anthracite in this coalfield is difficult to mine and does not occur in the continuous seams more typical of e.g. the northeast Pennsylvania Coal Region, making it not cost effective to mine.

The area today comprises recreational areas including the Tuscarora Trail and Sleepy Creek Wildlife Management Area. Abandoned mines can be found near the Tuscarora Trail.

== See also ==
- Meadow Branch
- List of coalfields
