= Midlothian Coalfield =

Coal mining region in Scotland

Coordinates: 55°54′N 3°06′W

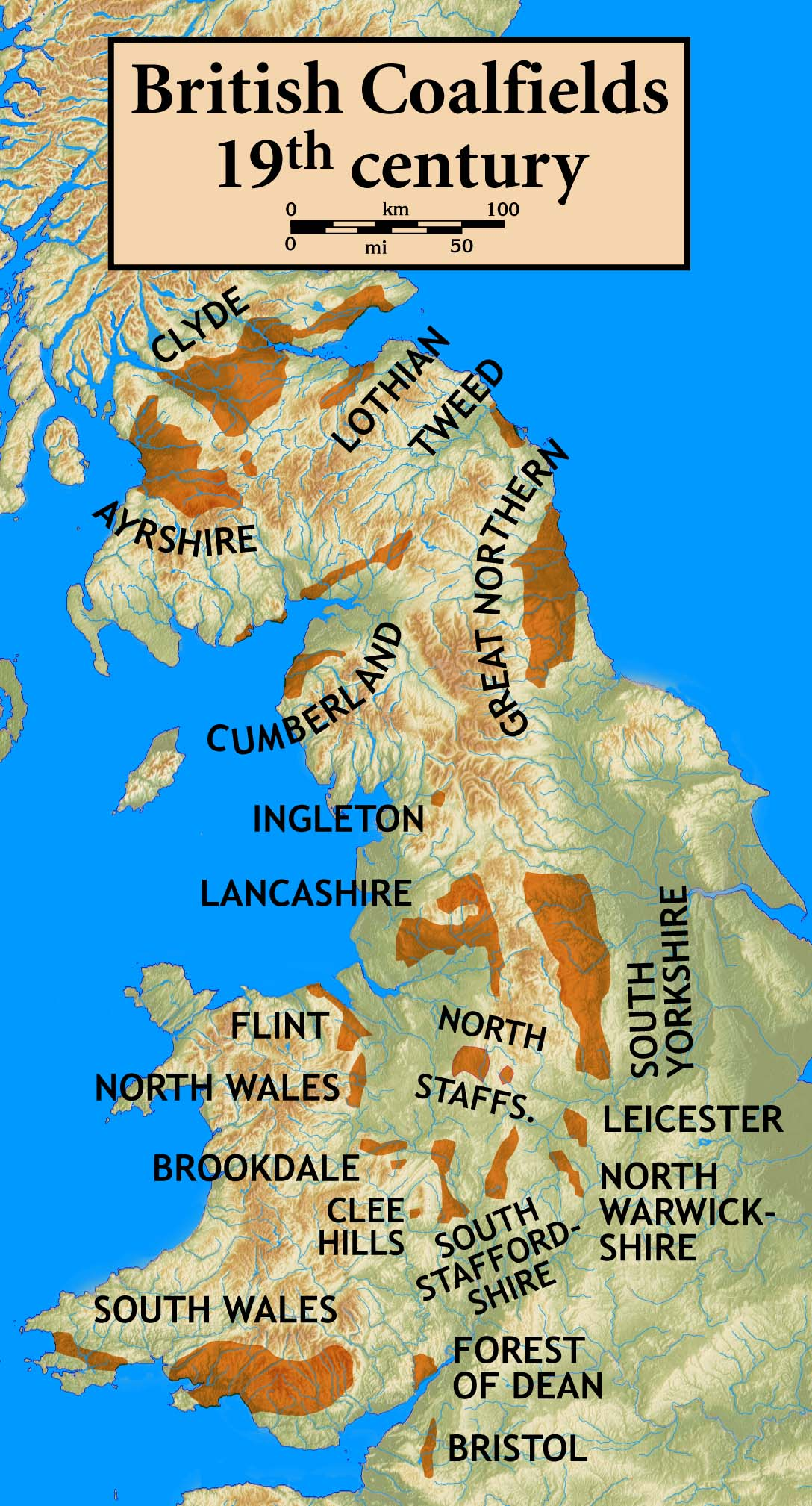
British Coalfields

The Midlothian Coalfield is a coalfield in southeast Scotland situated immediately to the east and southeast of Edinburgh. It is geologically continuous with the East Fife Coalfield beneath the Firth of Forth though the undersea coal reserves have only been partly exploited. There were undersea workings extending from Prestonlinks Colliery. The sulphur content of the majority of Midlothian coals is less than 1% making it especially suitable for modern requirements.

== Geology ==
The following seams were worked. They are shown in rough stratigraphical order thought not all seams are present throughout the coalfield. Those shown in bold were worked to the greatest extent:

Within the Scottish Coal Measures Group (Middle and Lower Coal Measures):

- Clayknowes Coal
- **(Musselburgh) Splint Coal**
- **(Musselburgh) Rough Coal**
- Beefie Coal
- **Musselburgh Jewel Coal**
- Golden Coal
- Little Splint Coal
- **Cowpits Five Foot Coal**
- Glass Coal
- **Salters Coal**
- Musselburgh Nine Foot Coal
- Musselburgh Fifteen Foot Coal
- Pinkie Six Foot Coal
- Musselburgh Seven Foot Coal
- Eskmouth Extra Coal

Within the Upper Limestone Formation:

- South Parrot Coal

Within the Limestone Coal Formation:

- **Great Seam Coal**
- Gillespie Coal
- **Blackchapel Coal**
- Kittlepurse Coal
- **Peacock Coal**
- **South Bryans Splint Coal**
- Stony Coal
- Ball Coal
- Loanhead No 1 Coal
- Corbie Coals
- Andrews Coal
- South Coal
- **North Coal**
- **Stairhead Coal**

Within the Lower Limestone Formation

- **North Greens Coal**

Within the West Lothian Oil-Shale Formation

- Houston Coal
- various oil-shale horizons

Monktonhall Colliery was abandoned in 1997 and Blinkbonny mine adit was sealed in 2003 so bringing to an end a long history of deep-mining of coal within the coalfield. Opencasting has continued at various sites since then including Blinkbonny, Oxenfoord, Gourlaw and Newbigging Farm.
