= Zhunggar coalfield =

- Location: Xinjiang, China
- Products: Coal

The Zhunggar is a large coal field located in the north of China in Xinjiang. Zhunggar represents one of the largest coal reserve in China having estimated reserves of 10 billion tonnes of coal.

== See also ==
- Coal in China
- List of coalfields
