= William Reid (mining engineer) =

Sir William Reid FRSE FIME DSc DCL (20 June 1906–2 October 1985) was a 20th-century Scottish businessman and mining engineer. He served as President of the Mining Institute of Scotland 1951/2 and as President of the Institute of Mining Engineers 1956/7. He was Chairman of the Durham Division of the National Coal Board.

== Life ==
He was born on 20 June 1906 the son of Sir Charles Carlow Reid (1879–1961), a mining engineer and author of the "Reid Report" on British mining, and cousin to mining entrepreneur Charles Augustus Carlow.

William was educated at Dollar Academy. He studied mining and metallurgy at the University of Edinburgh graduating with a BSc in 1929 and gaining a doctorate (PhD) in 1933.

In 1956 he was elected a Fellow of the Royal Society of Edinburgh. His proposers were Robert McAdam, Sir Edmund Hirst, James Pickering Kendall, and Hugh Bryan Nisbet. He received honorary doctorates from Heriot-Watt University in 1967 (DSc) and from Durham University in 1970 (DCL).

He was knighted by Queen Elizabeth II in 1972.

He died on 2 October 1985 is buried with his parents in Beath Cemetery in Cowdenbeath in Fife.

== Family ==
He was married to Sheila Janette Christiana Davidson.

== Publications ==
- The Reconstruction of the British Mining Industry (1949) with his father Sir Charles Reid
