= Juye coalfield =

Coal mine in Shandong, China

- Location: Shandong, China
- Products: Coal

The Juye is a large coal field located in the east of China in Shandong. Juye is one of the largest coal reserves in China, with estimated reserves of 28.1 billion tonnes of coal. It is home to the Zhaolou Coal Mine Coal Reserve.

== See also ==
- Coal in China
- List of coalfields
