= Peace River coalfield =

- Location: British Columbia, Canada
- Products: Coal

The Peace River is a large coal field located in the west of Canada in British Columbia. Peace River represents one of the largest coal reserve in Canada having estimated reserves of 4.9 billion tonnes of coal.

== See also ==
- List of coalfields
