= Taber coalfield =

- Location: Alberta, Canada
- Products: Coal

The Taber is a large coal field located in the western part of Canada in Alberta. Taber represents one of the largest coal reserve in Canada having estimated reserves of 335 billion tonnes of coal.

== See also ==
- List of coalfields
