= East Kootenay coalfield =

- Location: British Columbia, Canada
- Products: Coal

The East Kootenay is a large coal field located in the west of Canada in British Columbia. East Kootenay represents one of the largest coal reserve in Canada having estimated reserves of 8 billion tonnes of coal.

== See also ==
- List of coalfields
