= Drumheller coalfield =

Coal mine in Alberta, Canada

Location
- Location: Alberta, Canada

Production
- Products: Coal

The Drumheller is a large coal field located in the western part of Canada in Alberta. Drumheller represents one of the largest coal reserve in Canada having estimated reserves of 564 billion tonnes of coal.

== See also ==
- List of coalfields
