= Gething coalfield =

Coal mine in Alberta, Canada

- Location: Alberta, Canada
- Products: Coal

The Gething is a large coal field located in the western part of Canada in Alberta. Gething represents one of the largest coal reserve in Canada having estimated reserves of 13 billion tonnes of coal.

== See also ==
- List of coalfields
