= Guajira coalfield =

Coal mine in Cesar, Colombia

- Location: Cesar department, Colombia
- Products: Coal

The Guajira is a large coal field located in the north of Colombia in Cesar department. Guajira represents one of the largest coal reserves in Colombia, having estimated reserves of 4.54 billion tonnes of coal.

== See also ==
- List of coalfields
