= Ruhr coalfield =

- Location: North Rhine-Westphalia, Germany
- Products: Coal

The Ruhr is a large coal field in North Rhine-Westphalia, the western part of Germany. Ruhr represents one of the largest coal reserves in Germany, with estimated reserves of 42 billion tonnes of coal.

== See also ==
- List of coalfields
- Rheinisches Braunkohlerevier
