= Guasare coalfield =

Coal mine in Zulia, Venezuela

- Location: Zulia, Venezuela
- Products: Coal

The Guasare is a large coal field located in the west of Venezuela in Zulia. Guasare represents one of the largest coal reserves in Venezuela, with estimated reserves of 8.62 billion tonnes of coal.

== See also ==
- List of coalfields
