= Ardley coalfield =

Location
- Location: Alberta, Canada

Production
- Products: Coal

History
- Opened: 1754

The Ardley is a large coal field located in the western part of Canada in Alberta. Ardley represents one of the largest coal reserve in Canada having estimated reserves of 596 billion tonnes of coal.

Existence of coal in the area was noted as early as 1754 by Anthony Henday.

The Ardley coalfield is located south of Alix, Alberta, along the banks of the Red Deer River.

== See also ==
- List of coalfields
