= MacKay coalfield =

Coal field in Alberta, Canada

- Location: Alberta, Canada
- Products: Coal

The MacKay is a large coal field located in the western part of Canada in Alberta. MacKay represents one of the largest coal reserve in Canada having estimated reserves of 403 billion tonnes of coal.

== See also ==
- List of coalfields
