= Sha'er Lake coalfield =

Sha'er Lake

- Location: Xinjiang, China
- Products: Coal

The Sha'er Lake is a large coal field located in the north of China in Xinjiang. Sha'er Lake represents one of the largest coal reserve in China having estimated reserves of 89.2 billion tonnes of coal.

== See also ==
- Coal in China
- List of coalfields
