= Carbon-Thompson coalfield =

Location
- Location: Alberta, Canada

Production
- Products: Coal

The Carbon-Thompson is a large coal field located in the western part of Canada in Alberta. Carbon-Thompson represents one of the largest coal reserve in Canada having estimated reserves of 183 billion tonnes of coal.

== See also ==
- Coal in Alberta
- List of coalfields
