= Northumberland Coalfield =

Coal mining area in north east England

Coordinates: 55.1589°N 1.6026°W

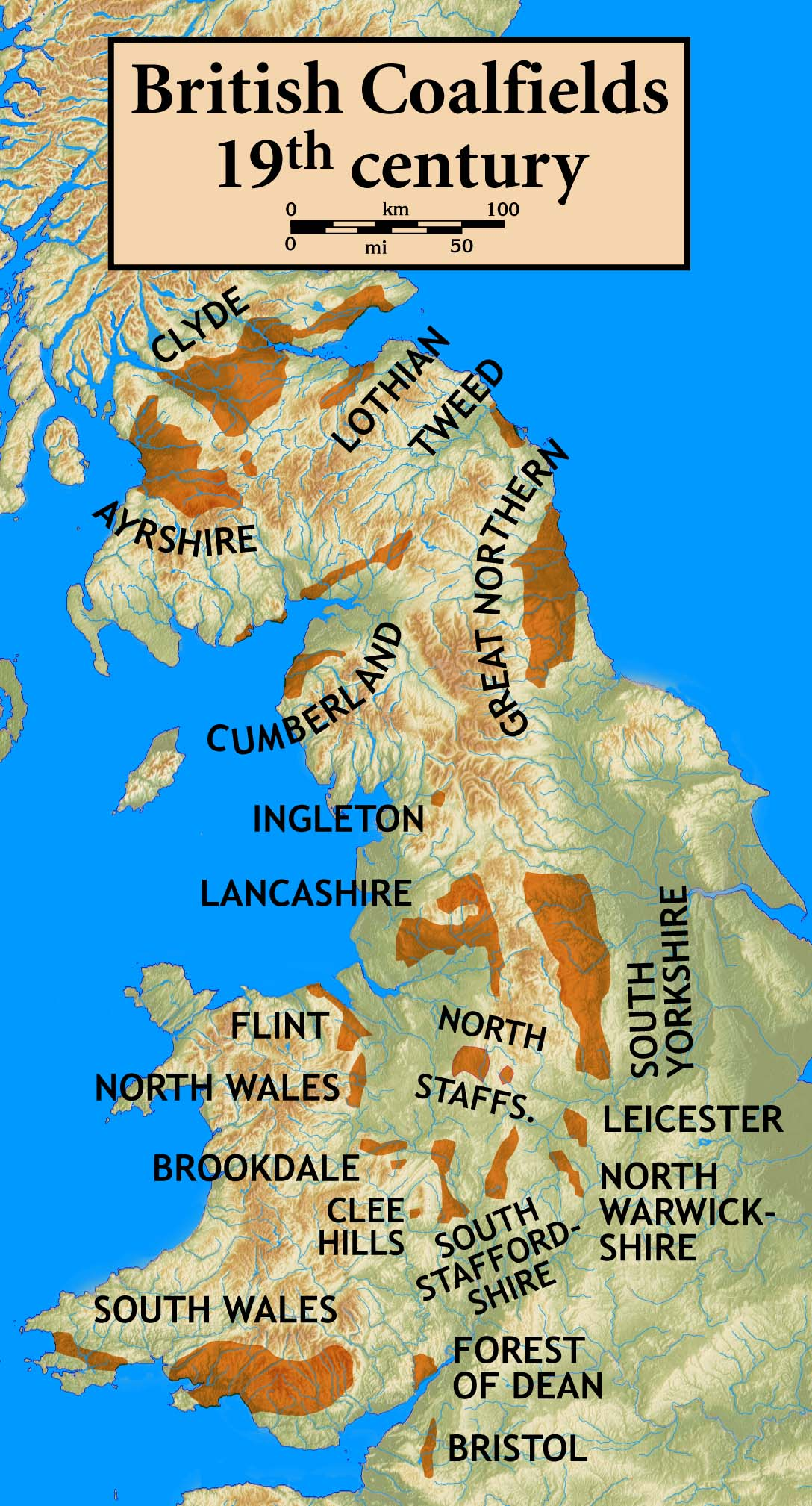
British Coalfields

The Northumberland Coalfield is a coalfield in north-east England. It is continuous with the Durham Coalfield to its south. It extends from Shilbottle in the north to the boundary with County Durham along the River Tyne in the south, beyond which is the Durham Coalfield.

The two contiguous coalfield areas were often referred to as the Durham and Northumberland Coalfield(s) or as the Great Northern Coalfield.

== Coal seams ==
The following coal seams are recorded from the Northumberland Coalfield. They are listed here in stratigraphic order with the youngest at the top and the oldest/deepest at the bottom. Not all seams are named and not all occur at any one locality.

=== Pennine Coal Measures Group ===
(Westphalian)

Upper Coal Measures

- Killingworth
- West Moor
- Top Hebburn Fell
- Bottom Hebburn Fell
- Usworth

Middle Coal Measures

- Burradon
- Rowlington
- Top Ryhope Five-Quarter
- Bottom Ryhope Five-Quarter
- Ryhope Little
- Top Moorland
- Bottom Moorland
- Ashington
- High Main
- Metal
- Five-Quarter
- Bentinck
- Yard
- Top Bensham
- Bottom Bensham
- Top Durham Low Main
- Bottom Durham Low Main
- Northumberland Low Main
- Broomhill Main

== Plessey Colliery ==
The Plessey Colliery is located in Blyth, Northumberland and opened in 1709. It was partially demolished create to the Plessey Waggonway and connect the surrounding coal mines, such as Cowpen.

Lower Coal Measures

- Beaumont
- Bottom Beaumont
- Top Tilley
- Tilley
- Bottom Tilley
- Top Busty
- Bottom Busty
- Three-Quarter
- Stobswood New
- Brockwell
- Victoria
- Stobswood
- Marshall Green
- Ganister Clay
- Gubeon
- Saltwick

=== Yoredale Group ===
Stainmore Formation (Namurian)

- Stanton
- Top Netherwitton
- Bottom Netherwitton
- Top Coatyards
- Bottom Coatyards
- Little Limestone

Alston Formation (Visean)

- Parrot
- Townhead
- Shilbottle (Acre)
- Beadnell
- Greenses
- Blackhill
- Main
