= Nishisonogi coalfield =

The Nishisonogi coalfield is a coalfield which lies on the coast of Nagasaki. The coal field primarily lies under the sea, requiring access from nearby islands.

== See also ==
- Mitsubishi Takashima coal mine
- Mitsubishi Hashima coal mine
