= Ulugh-Khem coal basin =

Coal basin in Tuva, Russia

Ulugh-Khem (also known as the Central Tuva Basin) is a coal basin located in Tuva, Russia. It has an area of 2,300 km². Coal was originally found in Ulugh-Khem in 1883. Small-scale mining of Ulugh-Khem coal started 1914 and industrial mining in 1925. The coal deposits are from the Jurassic Period.
