= List of regions of the United Kingdom by GRDP =

This article lists the gross regional domestic product (GRDP) of regions of the United Kingdom, defined as Level 2 regions of the Nomenclature of Territorial Units for Statistics (NUTS 2), in nominal values. Values are shown in euros in the original source. For comparison, all figures are converted into pounds sterling and US dollars according to annual average exchange rates. (Note: Euro figures are converted to GBP and USD rates as of 31 December of a given year.) All values are given in millions, and converted values are rounded to the nearest whole number.

== 2024 ==
List of regions of the United Kingdom by GRDP at current market prices (2024)
Region	Population	GRDP		GRDP per head	
Region	Population	(£ millions)	(% annual real growth)	(£ per head)	(% annual real growth)
(England) North East	2,760,678	£82,703	1.6%	£29,957	0.3%
(England) North West	7,737,414	£285,709	1.6%	£36,926	0.2%
(England) Yorkshire and the Humber	5,672,962	£193,115	0.8%	£34,041	−0.3%
(England) East Midlands	5,063,164	£162,343	0.9%	£32,064	−0.2%
(England) West Midlands	6,187,204	£210,173	1.4%	£33,969	0.1%
East of England	6,576,306	£242,942	0.9%	£36,942	−0.4%
(England) London	9,089,736	£656,291	1.3%	£72,201	0.3%
(England) South East	9,642,942	£416,359	1.4%	£43,178	0.2%
(England) South West	5,889,695	£222,445	1.3%	£37,769	0.2%
Wales	3,186,581	£100,327	0.5%	£31,484	−0.1%
Scotland	5,546,900	£218,777	1.2%	£39,441	0.5%
Northern Ireland	1,927,855	£67,683	0.7%	£35,108	0.3%
Extra-regio	—	£25,140	−	—	—
United Kingdom	69,281,437	£2,884,006	+1.1%	£41,627	+0.02%

== 2018 ==
Areas of the United Kingdom by GRDP
Area	Rank	GRDP (EUR millions)	GRDP (GBP millions)	GRDP (USD millions)
United Kingdom	—	2,423,737	2,144,961	2,862,460
Inner London – West	1	254,771	225,467	300,887
Inner London – East	2	137,068	121,303	161,879
Berkshire, Buckinghamshire and Oxfordshire	3	120,073	106,262	141,808
Surrey, East and West Sussex	4	106,127	93,920	125,337
Gloucestershire, Wiltshire and Bristol/Bath area	5	93,009	82,311	109,845
Outer London – West and North West	6	91,379	80,869	107,920
Greater Manchester	7	90,182	79,809	106,506
West Midlands	8	88,490	78,312	104,508
East Anglia	9	81,599	72,214	96,369
Eastern Scotland	10	73,377	64,937	86,659
Bedfordshire and Hertfordshire	11	73,217	64,796	86,470
Hampshire and Isle of Wight	12	72,022	63,738	85,059
West Yorkshire	13	70,290	62,205	83,013
Derbyshire and Nottinghamshire	14	61,414	54,350	72,531
Leicestershire, Rutland and Northamptonshire	15	57,939	51,275	68,427
Essex	16	54,183	47,951	63,991
Kent	17	53,865	47,670	63,615
Northern Ireland	18	53,591	47,427	63,292
West Central Scotland	19	48,000	42,479	56,689
Outer London – East and North East	20	47,536	42,068	56,141
Herefordshire, Worcestershire and Warwickshire	21	46,976	41,573	55,479
West Wales and the Valleys	22	45,243	40,039	53,432
Shropshire and Staffordshire	23	44,102	39,029	52,085
Lancashire	24	43,315	38,333	51,155
Merseyside	25	42,675	37,767	50,400
Cheshire	26	41,250	36,505	48,717
Outer London – South	27	41,052	36,300	48,483
Northumberland and Tyne and Wear	28	40,715	36,032	48,085
Dorset and Somerset	29	38,135	33,749	45,038
East Wales	30	37,414	33,111	44,186
South Yorkshire	31	34,690	30,700	40,969
Devon	32	31,938	28,265	37,719
Tees Valley and Durham	33	28,660	25,364	33,848
North Yorkshire	34	26,307	23,281	31,069
East Yorkshire and Northern Lincolnshire	35	25,689	22,734	30,339
North Eastern Scotland	36	23,157	20,494	27,349
Southern Scotland	37	20,475	18,120	24,181
Lincolnshire	38	19,022	16,834	22,465
Highlands and Islands	39	15,471	13,692	18,271
Cumbria	40	15,175	13,430	17,922
Cornwall and Isles of Scilly	41	13,918	12,317	16,437

== See also ==
- NUTS statistical regions of the United Kingdom
