= Kamptee Coalfield =

Coalfield in India

- Location in Maharashtra
- Location: Maharashtra, India; 21°14′32″N 79°13′57″E
- Company: Western Coalfields Limited
- Website: http://westerncoal.gov.in/

Kamptee Coalfield is located in Nagpur district in the Vidarbha region of the Indian state of Maharashtra.

== The coalfield ==
Coalfieds in the Nagpur region are Kamptee, Bokhara and Umrer.

Kamptee Coalfield lies north of Kanhan railway station in Nagpur district. The coalfield extends in north-westerly direction from Kanhan railway station towards Saoner.

=== Exploration ===
While presently (2012) only one mine is being worked in Kamptee Coalfield, detailed exploration has revealed large deposits of coal in three blocks: Ghatrohan area to the east of the Kanhan river, Silewara area to the west of the Kanhan river, Bina area to the south of the Kanhan river. Non-coking coal is available in five workable seams. The moisture content of the coals varies from 8 to 11% and the volatile matter from 33 to 43%.

== Reserves ==
According to the Geological Survey of India, Kamptee Coalfield has total reserves of 2,296.84 million tonnes of non-coking coal, up to a depth of 1,200 m, out of which 1,233.74 million tonnes are proved reserves and the rest being indicated or inferred. Bulk of the coal is up to a depth of 300 m.
