= Tuckahoe Group =

- Stratigraphic range: Triassic
- Type: Group

Location
- Region: Virginia
- Country: United States

The Tuckahoe Group is a geologic group in Virginia. It preserves fossils dating back to the Triassic period.

== See also ==
- List of fossiliferous stratigraphic units in Virginia
- Paleontology in Virginia
