= William Lindsay (shipowner) =

Scottish shipowner

William Lindsay FRSE SSC
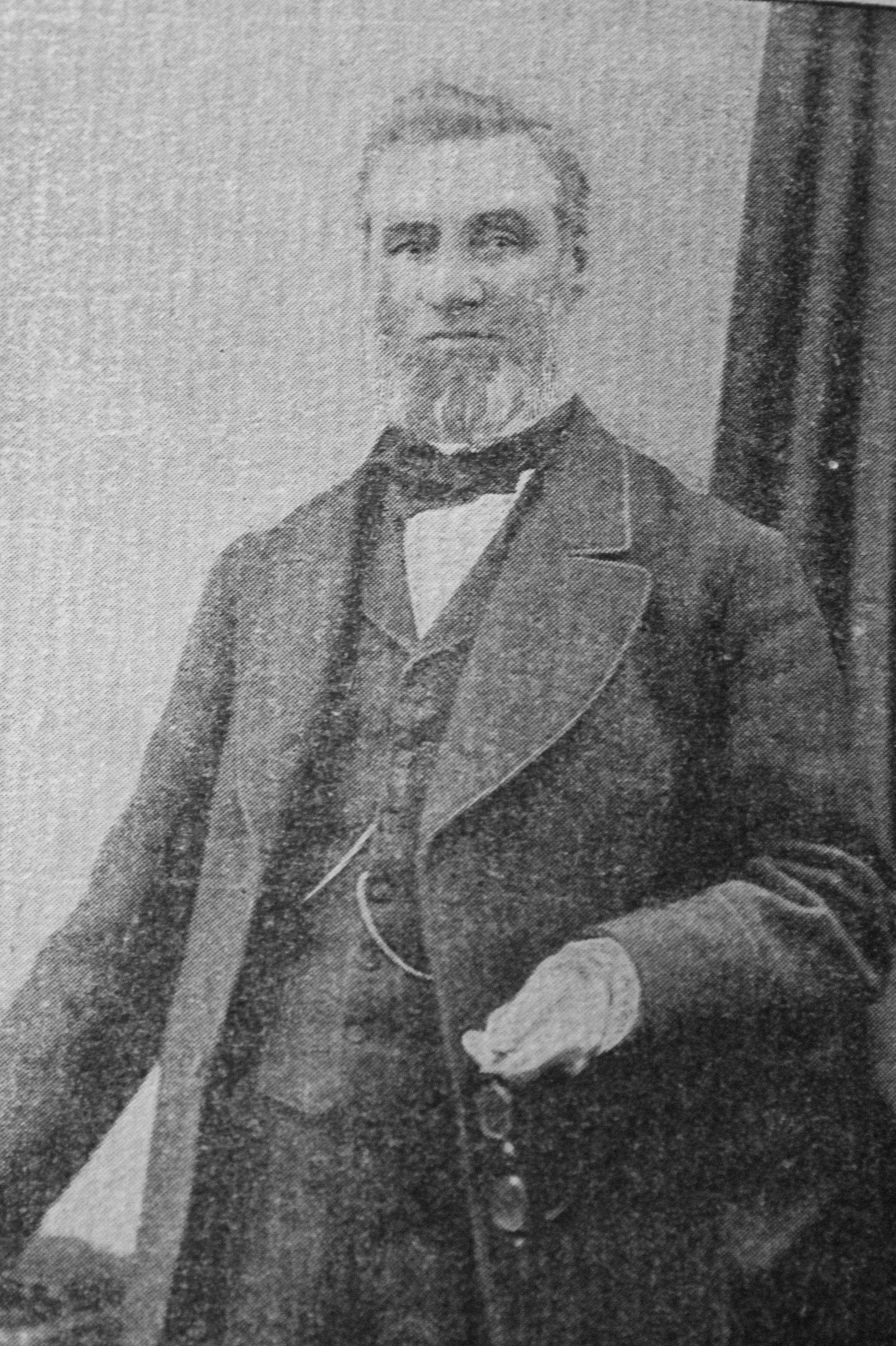
- Provost William Lindsay
- Born: 24 November 1819; Leith, Edinburgh, Scotland
- Died: 20 February 1884 (aged 64); Leith, Edinburgh, Scotland
- Occupations: Shipowner, lawyer
- Spouse: Mary Weatherstone Bruce (m. 1844; died 1881)
- Children: 3
- Parent(s): James Lindsay; Helen Allan
- Relatives: Charles Augustus Carlow (grandson)

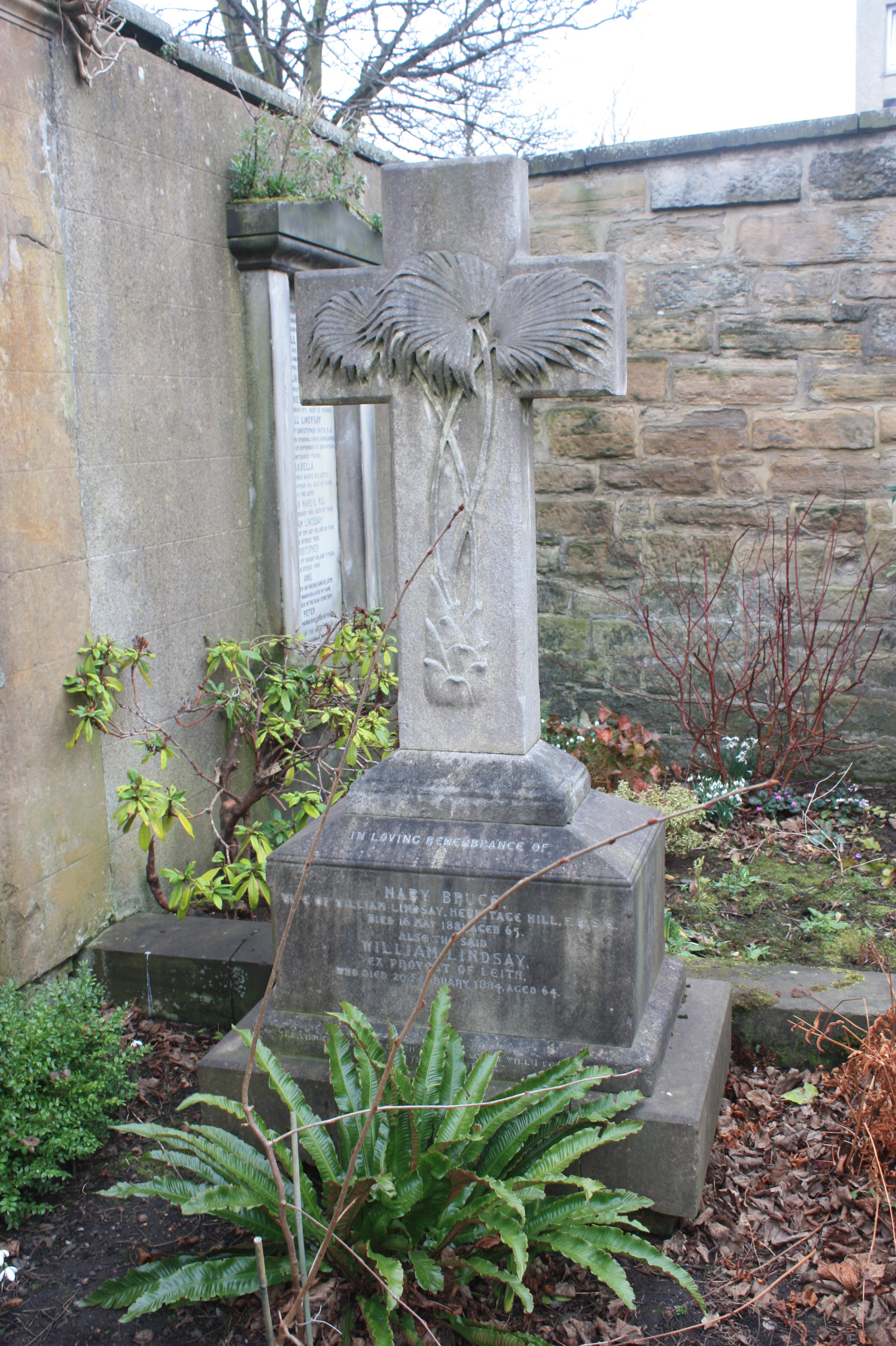
The grave of Provost Lindsay, South Leith Churchyard

William Lindsay FRSE SSC (24 November 1819 – 20 February 1884) was a Scottish shipowner who served as Provost of Leith from 1860 to 1866. Lindsay Road in Edinburgh is named after him.

As a lawyer he was responsible from framing the General Police and Improvement Act (Scotland) of 1869 which was known as the Lindsay Act.

== Life ==
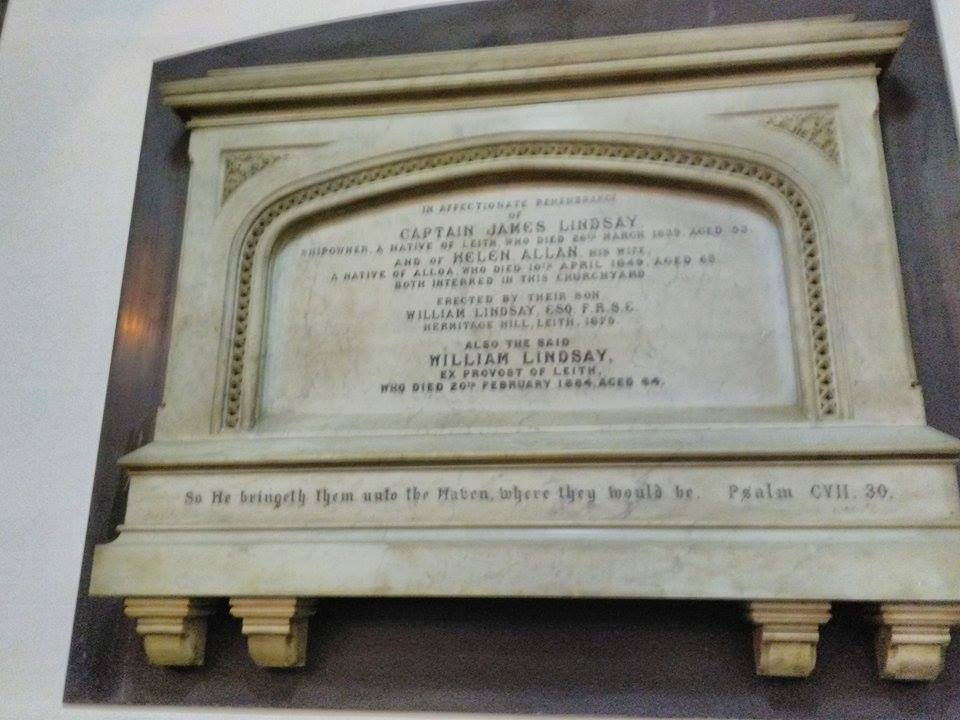
Memorial to William Lindsay, South Leith Parish Church

He was born in 1819 on Coburg Street in North Leith. He was the son of Captain James Lindsay (d.1839), a shipmaster, and his wife, Helen Allan of Alloa.

He was apprenticed to Alexander Simson SSC nearby, at 38 Bernard Street as a solicitor. He moved to Edinburgh to w0rk as lead assistant to Edmund Baxter WS at 32 Castle Street. By 1845 he had qualified as a Solicitor of the supreme Courts (SSC) and had opened his own office at 13 Bernard Street in Leith, living nearby at 74 Constitution Street.

In 1851 he became agent and personal assistant to James Moncreiff, 1st Baron Moncreiff on his appointment as MP to Leith Burghs. He continued this role through several successive MPs. At the outbreak of the Crimean War in 1853 he invested heavily in a fleet of steamships to go into service in the Black Sea.

In 1860 he became Provost and Chief Magistrate of Leith and organised the remodelling of Leith Town Hall to accommodate a new court room and prison (still extant) and absorb a line of Georgian houses to the east to create Leith Police Station. He was also responsible for the building of the new Corn Exchange on the north section of Constitution Street, the widening of Tollbooth Wind and works around Leith Fort the road to north being then named Lindsay Road in his honour.

In 1864 he was elected a Fellow of the Royal Society of Edinburgh his proposer being Thomas Williamson. From 1864 until death he left the legal world and started a local shipping company, owning several ships.

In 1875, he was living at Hermitage Hill in Leith, a large Georgian villa south of Leith Links.

He died on 20 February 1884. A memorial was erected to his memory in the south aisle of South Leith Parish Church.

== Family ==
He was married to Mary Weatherstone Bruce (d.1881). They had three children: James William (b. 1849), Mary Weatherstone (b. 1851), and William Walter (b. 1854).

He was grandfather to Charles Augustus Carlow FRSE, the son of his daughter, Mary Weatherstone Lindsay (1851-1929).

== Artistic recognition ==
His portrait by John Horsburgh is held by the City of Edinburgh Council at Leith Town Hall (now Leith Police station) along with a marble bust of him.

A bust in white Carrera marble by William Brodie RSA was presented to Lindsay on 15 October 1864 was presented by Edinburgh citizens at the Waterloo Hotel in central Edinburgh together with a large piece of engraved silver plate. The bust was then gifted to Leith Town Hall.
