= List of University of Alberta buildings =

The University of Alberta comprises five campuses and over 400 buildings.

List of notable buildings on the main campus of the University of Alberta.

Name	Year	Architect	Notes	Photo
Athabasca Hall	1911	Allan Merrick Jeffers		Athabasca Hall, 1928. UAA-1969-018-034, University of Alberta Archives.
Campus Master Plan	1912	Percy Erskine Nobbs, Frank Darling	Partially executed	
Assiniboia Hall	1913	Allan Merrick Jeffers		
Pembina Hall	1914	Cecil Scott Burgess		Pembina Hall, Athabasca Hall and Assiniboia Hall with the Quad and trees in the forefront. 1943
South Laboratories	1914	Percy Erskine Nobbs	Now Triffo Hall	Triffo Hall, 2008.
Power Plant	1914	Percy Erskine Nobbs		
Arts Building	1915	Percy Erskine Nobbs		University of Alberta Arts' Building, 1924, UAA-1969-097-001, University of Alberta Archives.
North Laboratories	1919	Percy Erskine Nobbs	Demolished	
Medical Building	1922	Percy Erskine Nobbs, Cecil Scott Burgess	then Dentistry/Pharmacy Centre, now University Commons	Front of Medical Building, 1922. UAA-1969-097-347. University of Alberta Archives,
Students' Union Building	1950		Now University Hall	
Rutherford Library	1951	Rule Wynn and Rule		Interior view of Rutherford Library South large reading room (AKA the Harry Potter Room), 2019.
Engineering Building	1951	Rule Wynn and Rule	Now South Academic Building	
Agriculture Building	1954	Max Dewar	Now Earth Sciences Building; significantly altered	
Administration Building	1956		demolished (2026) The demolition site of where the Administration building once stood	Administration Building at University of Alberta
Education Building	1962	H.A. Henderson		
University of Alberta Faculty Club	1964			
Henry Marshall Tory Building	1966			
HUB Mall			Housing for international students, as well as a shopping mall	
Students' Union Building	1967	Richards Berretti and Jelinek		South face of the Students' Union Building (SUB), 2008
Universiade Pavilion (Butterdome)	1983		Built for the 1983 Summer Universiade, nicknamed the Butterdome	The Butterdome (University Pavilion) undergoing renovation to its exterior 2026
Engineering Teaching and Learning Complex	2002			Front of the Engineering Teaching and Learning Complex (ETLC), 2008
Electrical and Computer Engineering Research Facility	2002			
Allan P. Markin Canadian Natural Resources Limited Natural Resources Engineering Facility	2005			Natural Resource Engineering Facility (NREF), 2008
National Institute for Nanotechnology	2006			National Institute for Nanotechnology, 2010
Centennial Centre for Interdisciplinary Science (CCIS)	2011	Flad Architects and ONAP Architects		
Donadaeo Innovation Centre for Engineering	2015			
Lister Centre			Student residence and conference centre named after Reg Lister.	View of main entrance from the inside of the building
