= Gillette Coalfield =

Gillette coalfield
- Location: Wyoming, United States
- Products: Coal

The Gillette Coalfield or Powder River Coalfield is a large coal field located in the north of the United States in Wyoming. Gillette represents one of the largest coal reserve in the United States having estimated reserves of 201 billion tonnes of coal.
