= Hat Creek coalfield =

- Location: British Columbia, Canada
- Products: Coal

The Hat Creek is a large coal field located in the west of Canada in British Columbia. Hat Creek represents one of the largest coal reserve in Canada having estimated reserves of 10 billion tonnes of coal.
