= Durham Coalfield =

Coal mining region in north east England

Coordinates: 54.8386°N 1.6045°W

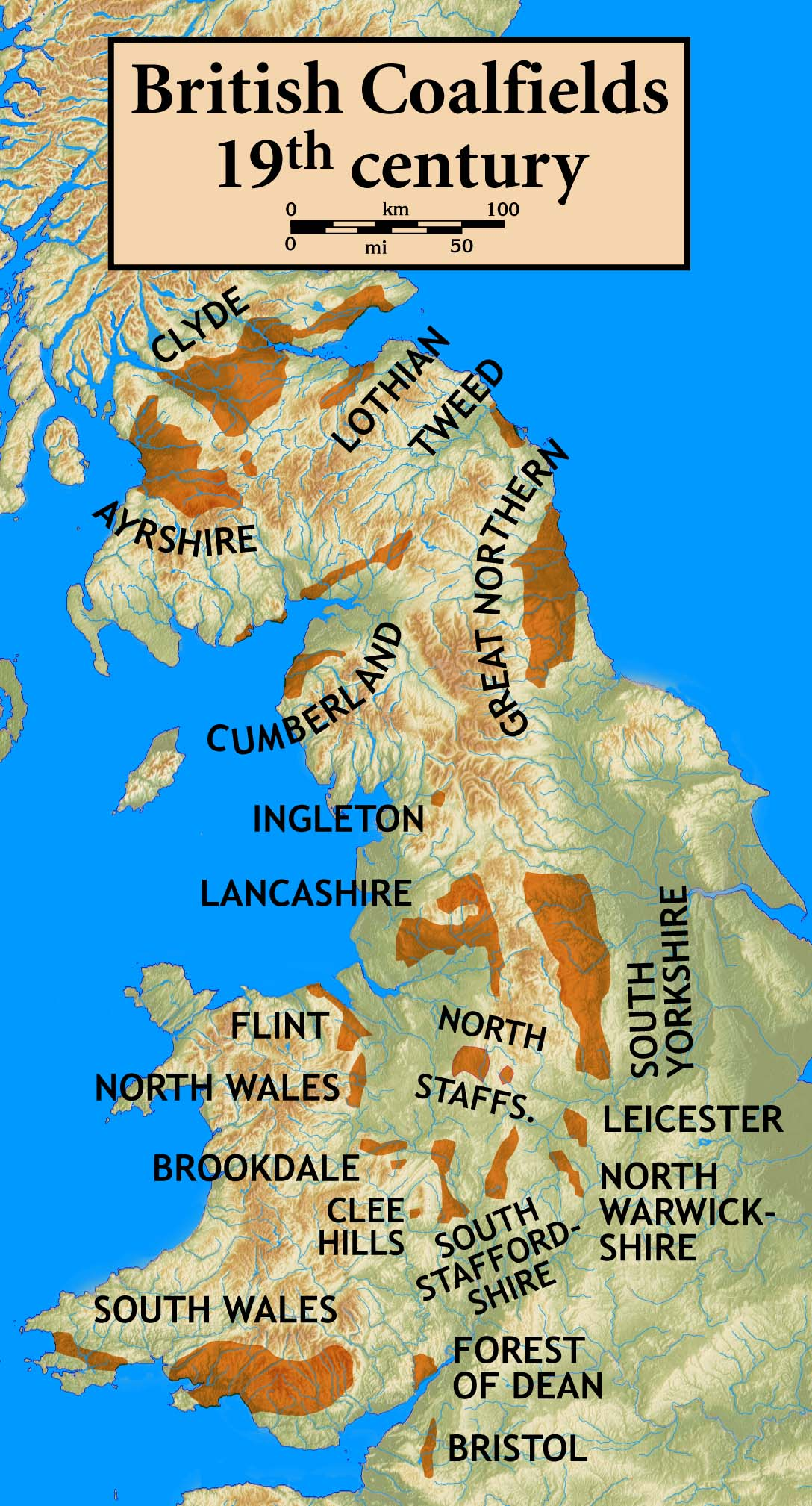
British Coalfields

The Durham Coalfield is a coalfield in north-east England. It is continuous with the Northumberland Coalfield to its north. It extends from Bishop Auckland in the south to the boundary with the county of Northumberland along the River Tyne in the north, beyond which is the Northumberland Coalfield.

The two contiguous coalfield areas were often referred to as the Durham and Northumberland Coalfield(s) or as the Great Northern Coalfield.

== Geology ==
See also Geology of County Durham

The following coal seams are recorded from the Durham coalfield. They are listed here in stratigraphic order with the youngest at the top and the oldest/deepest at the bottom:

Upper Coal Measures

- Hylton Castle

Middle Coal Measures

- Dean
- Hebburn Fell
- Usworth
- Ryhope Five-Quarter
- Ryhope Little
- High Main
- Metal
- Five-Quarter
- Main
- Maudlin
- Durham Low Main
- Brass Thill
- Hutton

Lower Coal Measures

- Harvey
- Tilley
- Busty
- Three-Quarter
- Brockwell
- Victoria
- Marshall Green
- Ganister Clay

== Future developments ==
No future development is planned. Previously, with the development of new technology to produce energy and capture carbon dioxide by carbon capture and storage (CCS) there was renewed interest in the exploitation of the Durham Coalfield reserves by underground coal gasification. This is strategically important to local energy-intensive industries, such as the commodity chemical and steel members of the Northeast of England Process Industry Cluster (NEPIC).
