= Amakusa coalfield =

The Amakusa coalfield consists of a group of coal mines on the main island of Amakusa, Kumamoto, Japan.

== History ==
The northern Amakusa coalfield was discovered during the Kyoho era (between 1716 and 1736), while Oniki, the southern part of the coalfield was discovered during the Tenpo era (between 1830 and 1843). The exploitation started in the northern part during the Meiji era. In 1897, a railroad was constructed for the transportation of coal between northern mines and Tomioka Bay, now Reihoku, Kumamoto, by Dainippon Rentan Company. Between 1900 and 1912, a monthly production of 4000 tons was recorded. In other areas, horse-drawn vehicles were employed. However, Amakusa coal mine was characterized by relatively thin layers of coal (30 cm - 100 cm) and the mining conditions were relatively difficult. So, only small-sized or medium-sized enterprises took part in the ventures. On the contrary, the characteristics of coal were good, such as anthracite, and the Japanese Imperial Navy bought Amakusa coal mine in great quantities.

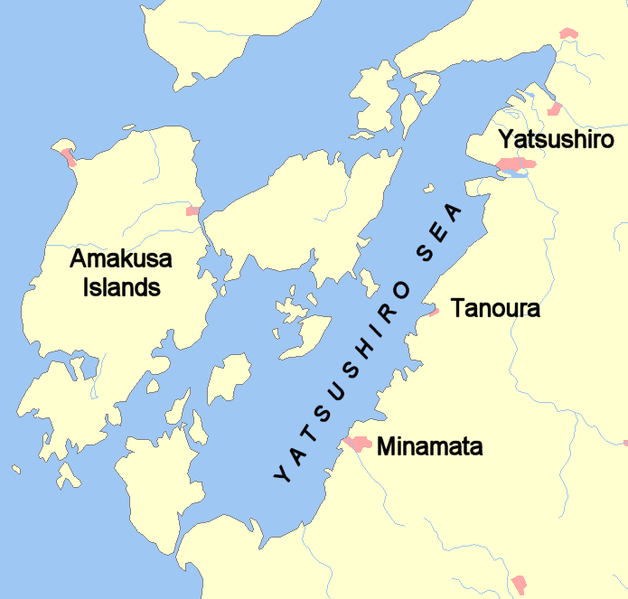
Amakusa islands at Yatsushiro Sea, in Japan. The largest island (left) is Shimoshima. Tomioka Bay is at the tip of the northwestern part, while Oniki is situated in the southwestern part of the island.

== The Change of the Government Policy ==
Around 1950, the Japanese government changed its policy and started importing cheap coal from foreign countries, and many Japanese coal mines had to be discontinued. The Amakusa coal mines were no exception. One of the southern Amakusa mines, Okini coal mine, was discontinued in 1975. Since there were no big enterprises, it is believed that more than 5,000,000 tons of coal remains there.

== Names of Amakusa Coal Mines around 1955 ==
- Northern mines
  - Sakasegawa, Ootake, Shiki, Reishu, Takenosako, Komatsu, Wakunobori, Kuratsuki, Ryoumatsu
- Central mines
  - Imatomi, Asahimuen
- Southern mines
  - Oniki, Gongen-yama, Sunatsuki, Horinosako, Nanten, Nakanoura

== Yearly Amounts Produced ==
Fiscal Year (年度)	Production
1946	61,071
1947	73,105
1948	90,543
1949	82,852
1950	83,360
1951	123,071
1952	137,638
1953	148,580
1954	164,844
1955	173,231
1956	212,591
1957	275,772
1958	278,693
1959	319,230
1960	398,606
1961	402,062
1962	370,827
1963	381,211
