= Fife Coalfield =

Coal mining region in Scotland

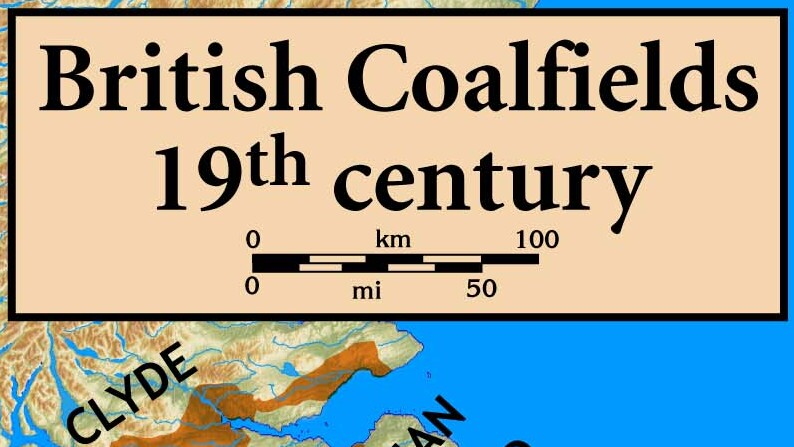
The Fife Coalfield can be seen to the east of the Clyde Coalfield

The Fife Coalfield was one of the principal coalfields in Scotland. Over fifty collieries were in operation at various times between the middle of the nineteenth century and the closure of the last pit in 1988. The coalfield extended across the southern part of Fife where rocks of the Coal Measures Group occur and was one of a series of coalfields throughout the Midland Valley from which coal was won by both deep workings and opencasting methods. It is traditionally divided into the West Fife, Central Fife and East Fife coalfields with Kirkcaldy having been a particularly important area. Some of the mines extended beyond Fife under the Firth of Forth following the seams which occupy the Leven Syncline which extends to the south shore of the firth at Musselburgh and beyond.

The Longannet power station near Kincardine used to source much of its coal from nearby pits but the Longannet coal mine closed after severe flooding in 2002, an event which more or less marked the end of deep mining in Fife and indeed Scotland. Opencasting in Fife was severely reduced after the premature closure of the power station. As of 2020, most opencasts have ceased production of coal, not only on a regional level but in Scotland as a whole.

== See also ==
- Fife and Kinross Miners' Association
- Fife Coal Company
