= Law on the Trustees of Labour =

1933 law of Nazi Germany

- Reichsadler of the Weimar Republic, from 1933 to 1935

Hitler cabinet
- Citation: RGBl. 1933 I p. 285
- Enacted by: Hitler cabinet
- Signed by: Adolf Hitler, Reich Chancellor; Franz Seldte, Labour Minister; Alfred Hugenberg, Economics Minister & Agriculture Minister; Wilhelm Frick, Interior Minister; Lutz Graf Schwerin von Krosigk, Finance Minister
- Signed: 19 May 1933
- Commenced: 20 May 1933
- Date of expiry: 1 January 1947
- Repealed: 30 November 1946

Repealed by
- Control Council Law No. 40
- Status: Repealed

The Law on the Trustees of Labour (German: Gesetz über Treuhänder der Arbeit) was a measure enacted by the government of Nazi Germany on 19 May 1933 that established the office of Trustee of Labour to regulate labour relations in Germany. The law was repealed by the Allied Control Council Law No. 40 of 30 November 1946, effective 1 January 1947.

== Background ==
The Nazi Party, after coming to power in Germany under Reich Chancellor Adolf Hitler on 30 January 1933, set about to eliminate all opposition and undertake a complete transformation of German society. It sought to bring all components of society into line with the Nazi worldview in a process that became known as Gleichschaltung ('coordination'). An early target of its campaign was the powerful German trade union movement. On 2 May 1933, Nazi SA stormtroopers attacked and occupied trade union offices throughout the country. The unions were dissolved, their officials were arrested, union newspapers and banks were closed and their funds were confiscated. On 10 May, the German Labour Front (Deutsche Arbeitsfront, DAF) was established under the leadership of Robert Ley, at that time the Stabschef ('chief of staff') of the Party's political organization. The DAF was a Nazi Party office that essentially replaced the myriad trade unions, ostensibly as the sole representative of a united German workforce.

== Enactment ==
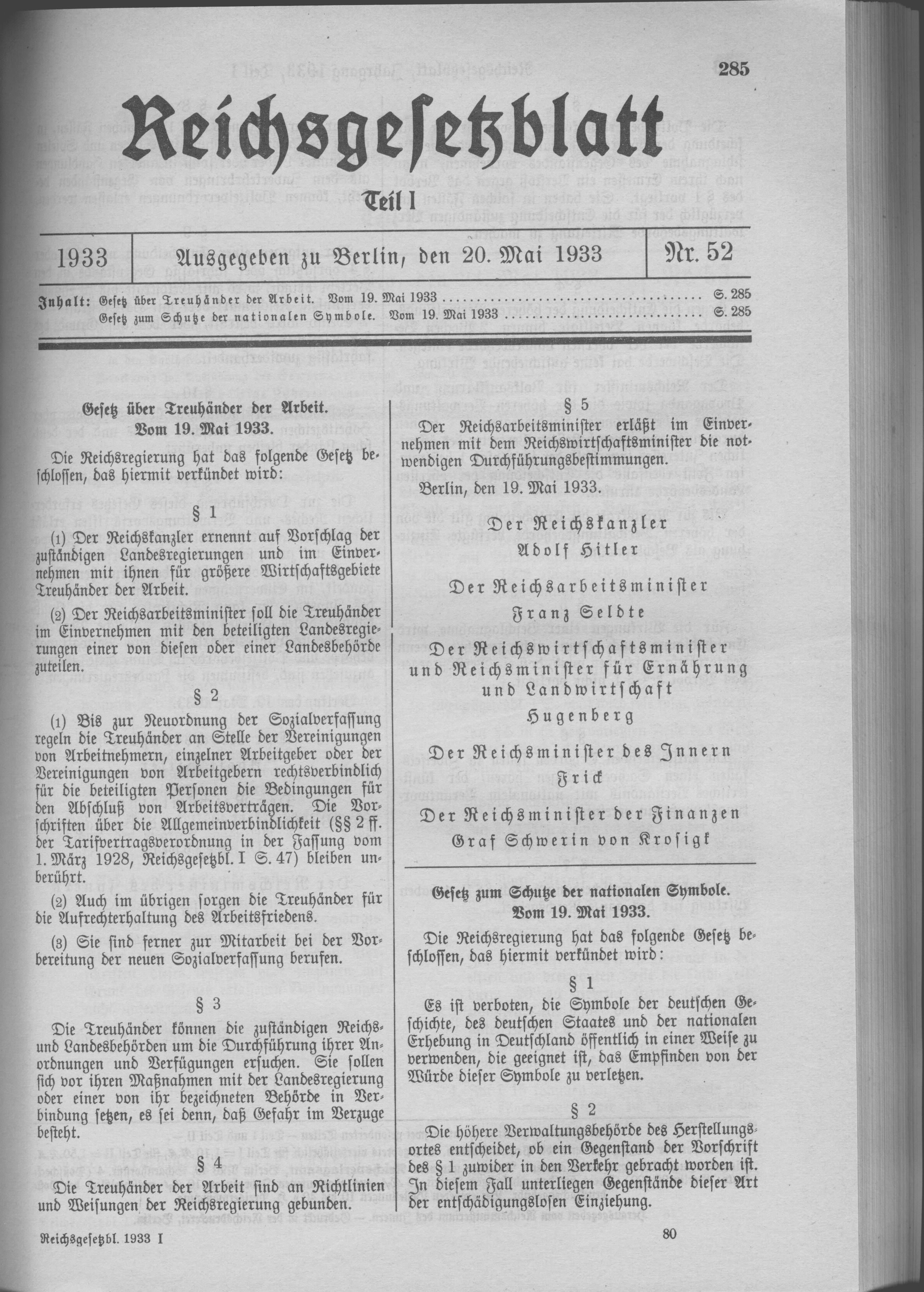
Promulgation of the Law on the Trustees of Labour in the Reichsgesetzblatt of 20 May 1933

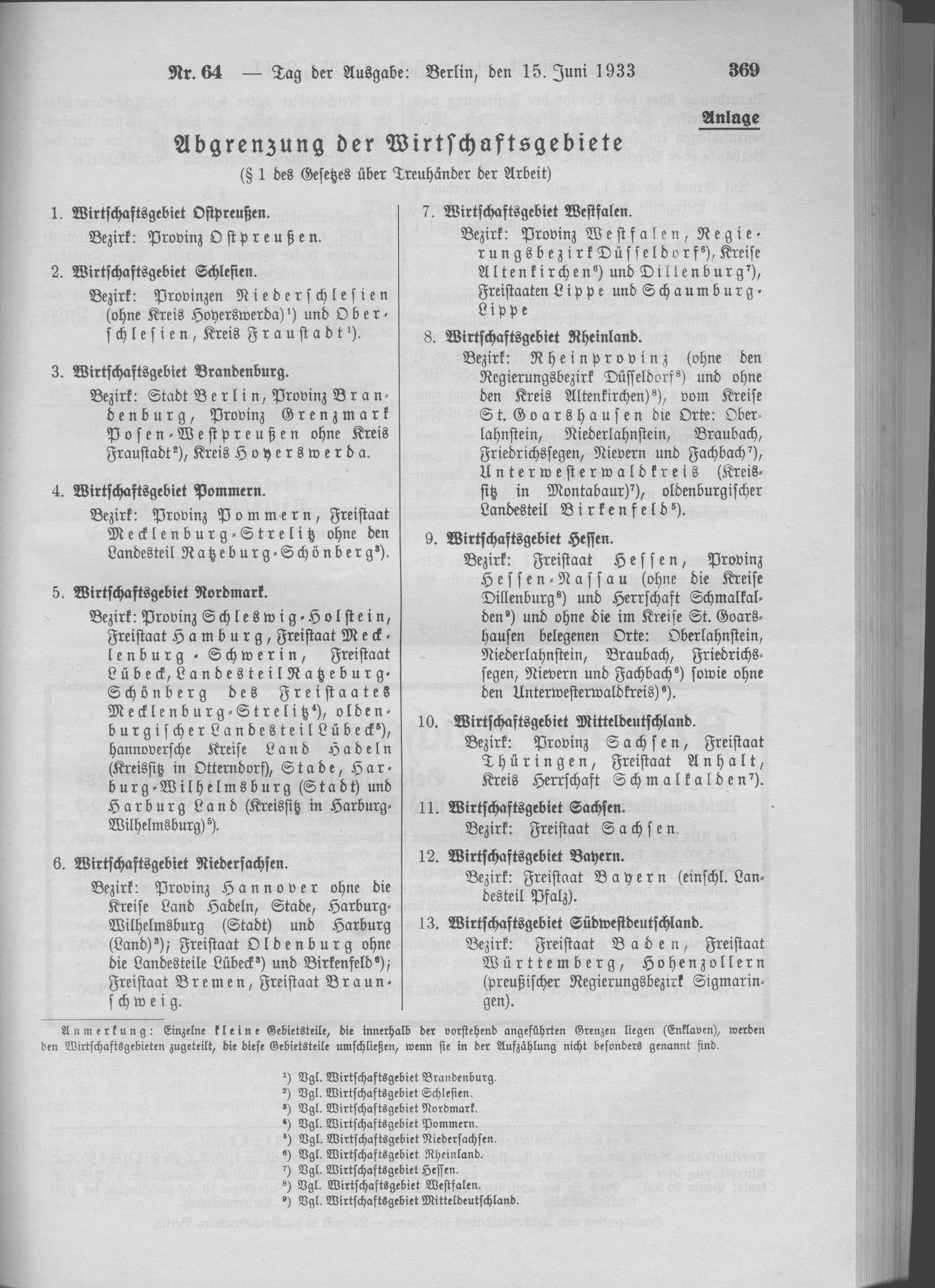
Designation of the first thirteen Wirtschaftsgebiete ('economic areas') in the Reichsgesetzblatt of 15 June 1933

In addition, the new position of Trustee of Labour was created by statute as a mechanism of control over labour relations. In accordance with the provisions of the Enabling Act, the Law on the Trustees of Labour was enacted solely by action of the Reich government (the Reich Chancellor and his cabinet) and was not placed before the Reichstag for legislative review, debate and approval. It went into effect when published in the Reichsgesetzblatt on 20 May 1933.

== Text ==
'Gesetz über Treuhänder der Arbeit vom 19. Mai 1933.'
Law on the Trustees of Labour of 19 May 1933
Die Reichsregierung hat das folgende Gesetz beschlossen, das hiermit verkündet wird:
The Reich Government has passed the following law, which is hereby promulgated:
§ 1

(1) Der Reichskanzler ernennt auf Vorschlag der zuständigen Landesregierungen und im Einvernehmen mit ihnen für größere Wirtschaftsgebiete Treuhänder der Arbeit.

(2) Der Reichsarbeitsminister soll die Treuhänder im Einvernehmen mit den beteiligten Landesregierungen einer von diesen oder einer Landesbehörde zuteilen.

§ 1

(1) The Reich Chancellor, at the suggestion of the responsible state governments and in agreement with them, appoints labour trustees for larger economic areas.

(2) The Reich Labour Minister should assign the trustees to one of them or to a state authority in agreement with the state governments involved.

§ 2

(1) Bis zur Neuordnung der Sozialverfassung regeln die Treuhänder an Stelle der Vereinigungen von Arbeitnehmern, einzelner Arbeitgeber oder der Vereinigungen von Arbeitgebern rechtsverbindlich für die beteiligten Personen die Bedingungen für den Abschluß von Arbeitsverträgen. Die Vorschriften über die Allgemeinverbindlichkeit (§§ 2 ff. der Tarifvertragsordnung in der Fassung vom 1. März 1928, Reichsgesetzbl. I S. 47) bleiben unberührt.

(2) Auch im übrigen sorgen die Treuhänder für die Aufrechterhaltung des Arbeitsfriedens.

(3) Sie sind ferner zur Mitarbeit bei der Vorbereitung der neuen Sozialverfassung berufen.

§ 2

(1) Until the social constitution is reorganised, the trustees, instead of the associations of employees, individual employers or associations of employers, regulate the conditions for the conclusion of employment contracts in a legally binding manner for the persons involved. The regulations regarding general applicability (§§ 2 ff. of the collective bargaining regulations in the version of 1 March 1928, Reich Law Gazette I p. 47) remain unaffected.

(2) The trustees also ensure that industrial peace is maintained.

(3) They are also called upon to participate in the preparation of the new social constitution.

§ 3

Die Treuhänder können die zuständigen Reichs- und Landesbehörden um die Durchführung ihrer Anordnungen und Verfügungen ersuchen. Sie sollen sich vor ihren Maßnahmen mit der Landesregierung oder einer von ihr bezeichneten Behörde in Verbindung setzen, es sei denn, daß Gefahr im Verzuge besteht.

§ 3

The trustees can request the relevant national and state authorities to implement their orders and decrees. Before taking any action, they should contact the state government or an authority designated by it, unless there is imminent danger.

§ 4

Die Treuhänder der Arbeit sind an Richtlinien und Weisungen der Reichsregierung gebunden.

§ 4

The trustees of labour are bound by the guidelines and instructions of the Reich government.

§ 5

Der Reichsarbeitsminister erläßt im Einvernehmen mit dem Reichswirtschaftsminister die notwendigen Durchführungsbestimmungen.

§ 5

The Reich Labour Minister issues the necessary implementing regulations in agreement with the Reich Economics Minister.

== Results ==
- There initially was one trustee for each of thirteen economic areas (Wirtschaftsgebiete).
- Hitler appointed the first Trustees of Labour on 15 June 1933.
- The duties and responsibilities of the trustees were set out in the Work Order Act (Arbeitsordnungsgesetz) of 20 January 1934. It made the trustees permanent Reich officials supervised by the Reich Ministry of Labour under Franz Seldte.
- The regulation of labour conflicts and the setting of wage levels by the trustees replaced collective bargaining between employers and employees.
- Since the decisions of the trustees were legally binding, strikes were effectively outlawed.
- By 1941, due to the geographic expansion of the Reich, there were twenty-two trustees and the position remained in existence through the fall of the Nazi regime in May 1945.

== Repeal ==
The Law on the Trustees of Labour, which had been superseded by the Work Order Act, was repealed by the Allied Control Council Law No. 40 (30 November 1946) with an effective date of 1 January 1947.

== See also ==
- German Labour Front
- Gleichschaltung
- Trustee of Labour
- Work Order Act

== Sources ==
- Broszat, Martin (1981). The Hitler State: The Foundation and Development of the Internal Structure of the Third Reich. New York: Longman Inc. ISBN 978-0-582-48997-4.
- Childers, Thomas (2017). The Third Reich: A History of Nazi Germany. New York: Simon & Schuster. ISBN 978-1-45165-113-3.
- Shirer, William Lawrence (1960), The Rise and Fall of the Third Reich: A History of Nazi Germany, New York City: Simon & Schuster, ASIN B0766DKDLR, LCCN 60006729, OCLC 1286630, OL 5794925M, Wikidata Q138029595
- Zentner, Christian; Bedürftig, Friedemann, eds. (1997) [1991]. The Encyclopedia of the Third Reich. New York: Da Capo Press. ISBN 978-0-306-80793-0.
