= Friedrich Völtzer =

German Nazi Party politician

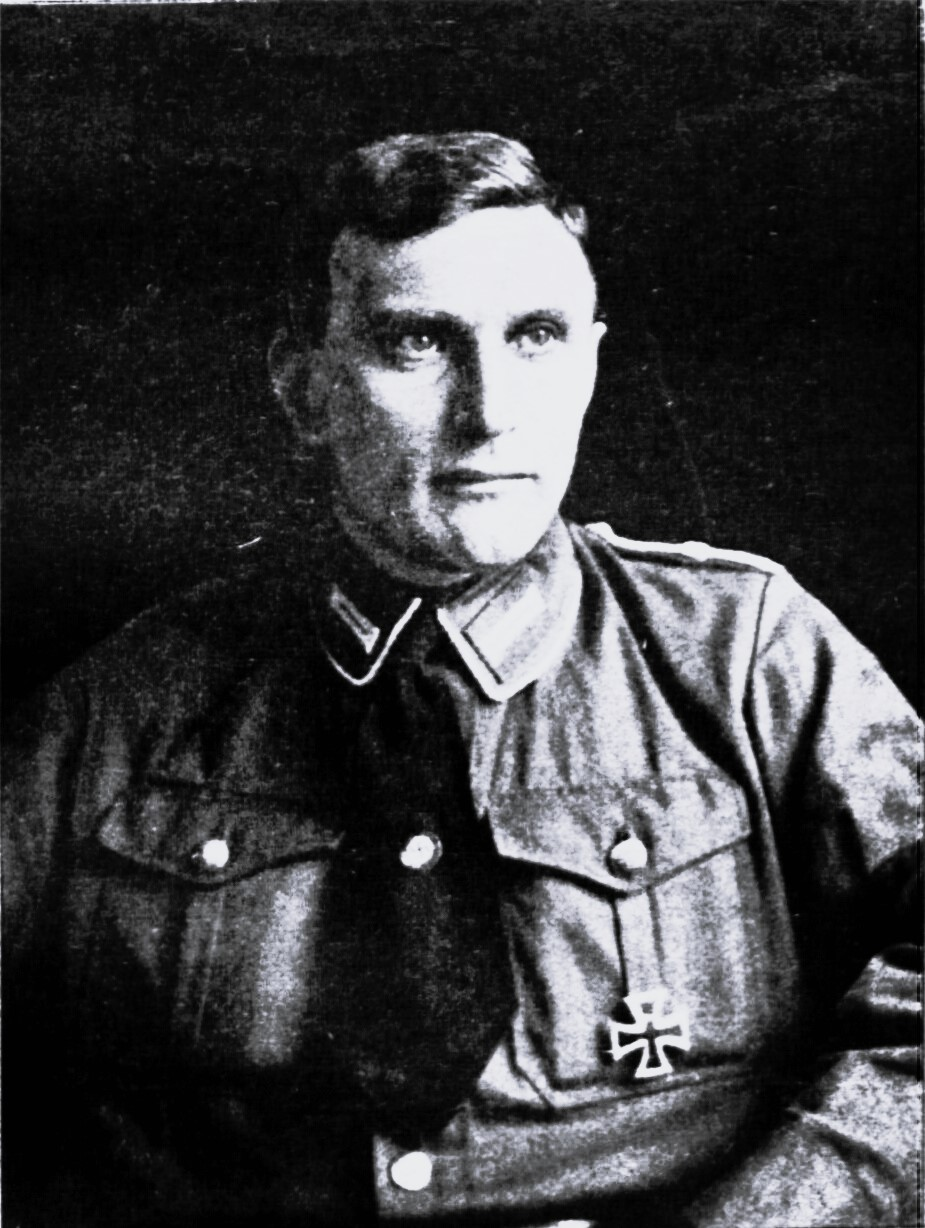
- Völtzer in March 1933

Reichskommissar Lübeck
- In office 11 March 1933 – 31 May 1933
- Preceded by: Office established
- Succeeded by: Office abolished

Senator for Finance and Economy Lübeck
- In office 31 May 1933 – 1 April 1934

Trustee of Labour Nordmark
- In office 16 June 1933 – 8 May 1945
- Preceded by: Office established
- Succeeded by: Office abolished

Personal details
- Born: 27 August 1895 Altona, Hamburg, German Empire
- Died: 22 September 1951 (aged 56) Großhansdorf, Schleswig-Holstein, West Germany
- Party: Nazi Party
- Education: University of Hamburg; University of Rostock

Military service
- Allegiance: German Empire
- Branch/service: Imperial German Army
- Years of service: 1914–1918
- Rank: Leutnant
- Unit: 31st (1st Thuringian) Infantry Regiment
- Battles/wars: World War I
- Awards: Iron Cross 1st and 2nd class, Hanseatic Cross of Hamburg; Wound Badge

Friedrich Völtzer (27 August 1895 – 22 September 1951) was a German economist and Nazi Party politician who served as the Reichskommissar for the Free City of Lübeck when the Nazis were consolidating their power over all the German Länder. He also served as a Senator in Lübeck and as a Trustee of Labour.

== Early life ==
Völtzer was born in Altona, a borough of Hamburg. He attended the prestigious Gymnasium Christianeum there, passed his matriculation examination and received his Abitur in 1914. After the outbreak of the First World War, he volunteered for service with the Imperial German Army that August and fought with the 31st (1st Thuringian) Infantry Regiment on the western front until 1917. He was twice seriously wounded, in November 1914 and April 1917. Commissioned as a Leutnant in the reserves in May 1916, he was awarded the Iron Cross 1st and 2nd class, and the Hanseatic Cross of Hamburg. During his convalescence, Völtzer began studying philosophy, history and economics at the University of Rostock in October 1917. He returned to his military duties but, after the end of the war, he was discharged and continued his studies in law and political science at Rostock and the University of Hamburg.

From 1920 to 1923, Völtzer was the syndic (representative) of the German Book Printers' Association of District X (Homburg, Lübeck, Mecklenburg & Schleswig-Holstein). He passed his doctorate examination in May 1924, with a dissertation on Lübeck's economic situation during the Napoleonic continental blockade. He then became the syndic and managing director of various employers' professional associations in Cuxhaven, then a part of the state of Hamburg. He was elected to the Cuxhaven city council in October 1927. In October 1928, however, he moved to the Free City of Lübeck when he became the syndic of its Chamber of Commerce.

== Nazi Party career ==
Völtzer joined the Nazi Party on 1 October 1931. After the Nazi seizure of power at the national level, they instituted a policy of Gleichschaltung (coordination) by which they sought to assert their control over all the German Länder. In early March 1933, the Reich government dispatched Reichskommissars to all the German states not yet governed by Nazis, including Lübeck. In the Reichstag election of 5 March, the Nazis took first place with nearly 44% of the vote. The next day, 6 March, under pressure from the Nazis, the four Social Democratic members of the governing Senate resigned, including Bürgermeister (mayor) Paul Löwigt. The remaining rump Senate appointed Walther Schröder, a Nazi member of the Bürgerschaft (state parliament), as acting Police President. On 11 March, seeking even more direct control by the central government, Reich Minister of the Interior Wilhelm Frick, used the authority of the Reichstag Fire Decree of 28 February 1933 to appoint Völtzer as the Reichskommissar for Lübeck.

Under Völtzer's tenure, on 3 April the Bürgerschaft was reconstituted on the basis of the Reichstag election results, giving a majority of seats to the Nazis and their coalition partners, the German National People's Party. Völtzer's time in charge, however, was to prove brief. On 26 May 1933, Gauleiter Friedrich Hildebrandt was appointed as Reichsstatthalter (Reich Governor) of Lübeck, as well as of the states of Mecklenburg-Schwerin and Mecklenburg-Strelitz. On 31 May, Hildebrandt appointed his Deputy Gauleiter, Otto-Heinrich Drechsler, as Bürgermeister of Lübeck, installed Schröder as the Senator for Interior Affairs and made Völtzer the Senator for Finance and Economy.

On 16 June 1933, under the auspices of the Reich Ministry of Labor, Völtzer was named the Trustee of Labour for the Nordmark region, encompassing Lübeck, Hamburg, Mecklenburg and the Prussian province of Schleswig-Holstein. He resigned his senatorial seat in Lübeck on 1 April 1934. He served as the president of the Nordmark Landesarbeitsamtes (state labor office) based in Hamburg from April 1934 to August 1943, and then as the president of the Schleswig-Holstein Landesarbeitsamtes based in Kiel. He was also a lecturer on the new social order at the University of Hamburg in 1934. He was a member of the National Socialist Association of Legal Professionals. Little is known of his post-war life, and he died on 22 September 1951 in Großhansdorf.

== Writings ==
- Lübecks Wirtschaftslage unter dem Druck der Kontinentalsperre, (1925) Lübeck: M. Schmidt-Römhild.

== Sources ==
- Buss, Hansjörg (2010). Entjudete Kirche. Die Lübecker Landeskirche zwischen christlichem Antijudaismus und völkischem Antisemitismus. Verlag Ferdinand Schöningh. ISBN 978-3-506-77014-1.
- Childers, Thomas (2017). The Third Reich: A History of Nazi Germany. New York: Simon & Schuster. ISBN 978-1-45165-113-3.
- Das Deutsche Führerlexikon 1934-1935. Berlin: Verlagsanftalt Otto Stollberg G. m. b. H. 1934.
- Friedrich Völtzer matriculation report from the University of Rostock Enrollment Database
- Zilch, Reinhold and Bärbel Holtz (Eds.): (2004) Die Protokolle des Preußischen Staatsministeriums 1817–1934/38, Band 12/II (4. April 1925 bis 10. Mai 1938), Olms-Weidmann, Hildesheim, ISBN 3-487-12704-0 (in: Acta Borussica. Neue Folge, Berlin-Brandenburgische Akademie der Wissenschaften).
