= Gleichschaltung =

Nazification process of German society

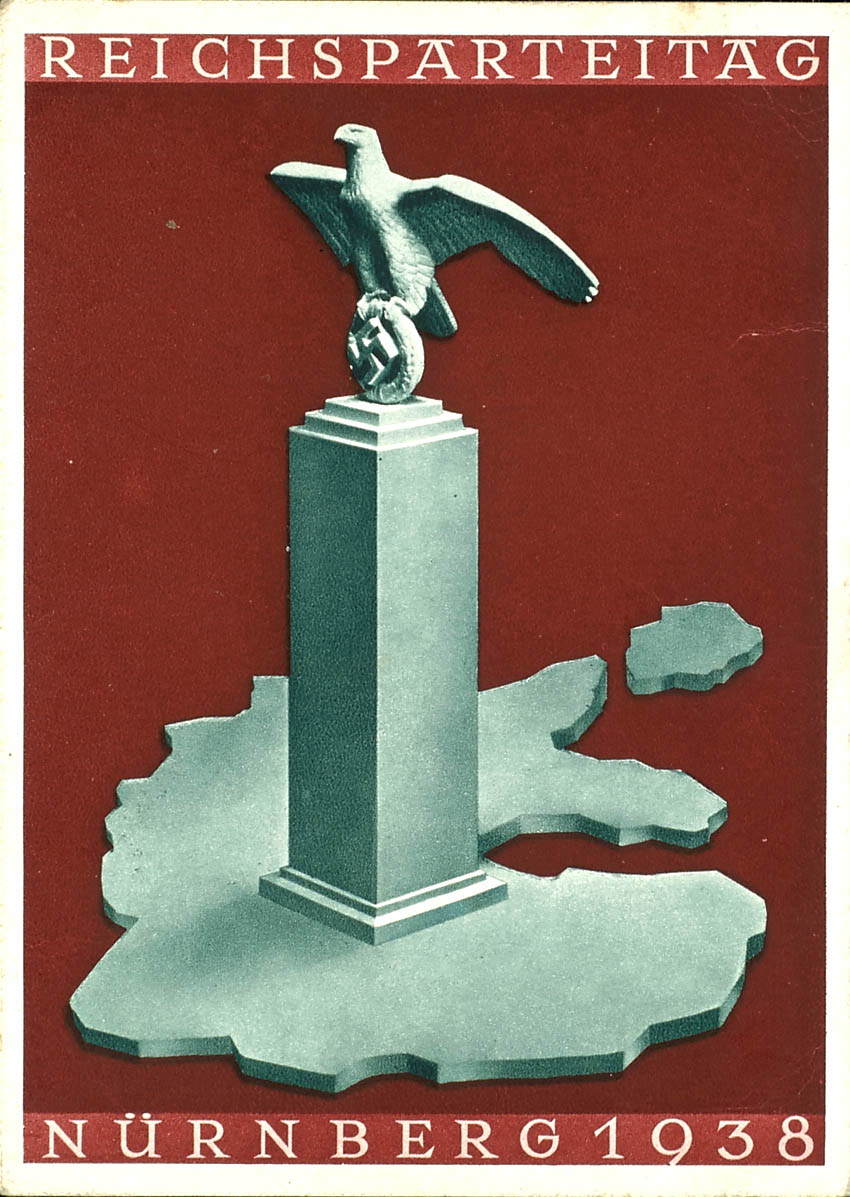
1938 Nuremberg Rally postcard, from the NSDAP Central Publishing House. A Nazi Reichsadler ('Reich eagle') towers over Germany and Austria.

In Nazi terminology, Gleichschaltung (German pronunciation: [ˈɡlaɪçʃaltʊŋ]), meaning 'synchronization' or 'coordination', was the process of Nazification by which Adolf Hitler—leader of the Nazi Party in Germany—established a system of totalitarian control and coordination over all aspects of German society "from the economy and trade associations to the media, culture and education".

Although the Weimar Constitution remained nominally in effect throughout Hitler's dictatorship, near total Nazification was achieved by 1935 with the resolutions approved during that year's Nuremberg Rally, fusing the symbols of the party and the state (see Flag of Nazi Germany) and depriving German Jews of their citizenship (see Nuremberg Laws). The tenets of Gleichschaltung, including the Nuremberg Laws, also applied to territories occupied by the German Reich.

== Terminology ==
Gleichschaltung is a compound word that comes from the German words gleich ('same') and Schaltung ('circuit', 'switching') and was derived from an electrical engineering term meaning that all switches are put on the same circuit allowing them all to be simultaneously activated with a master switch. Its first use is credited to Reich Justice Minister Franz Gürtner. It has been variously translated as "coordination", "Nazification of state and society", "synchronization", and "bringing into line". English texts often use the untranslated German word to convey its unique historical meaning. In their seminal work on National Socialist vernacular, Nazi-Deutsch/Nazi-German: An English Lexicon of the Language of the Third Reich, historians Robert Michael and Karin Doerr define Gleichschaltung as: "Consolidation. All of the German Volk's social, political, and cultural organizations to be controlled and run according to Nazi ideology and policy. All opposition to be eliminated." This accords with the general description provided by historian Jane Caplan, who characterized the term as "the coordination of German institutions into a cohesive, Nazified whole". (Note: Caplan remains critical of the term Gleichschaltung as an equalizing ideological structure within Nazi Germany; she claims the notion represents a "fraudulent edifice", since the extant social power structures and economic stratification more or less remained intact, despite Nazi propaganda suggesting otherwise.)

== Legal basis ==
The Nazis were able to put Gleichschaltung into effect due to multiple legal measures enacted by the Reich government during the 19 months following 30 January 1933, when Adolf Hitler became Chancellor of Germany. These decrees, acts and laws built an edifice of apparent legality by which the organs of government, and the levers of political power, were brought under the control of the Nazis and Hitler.

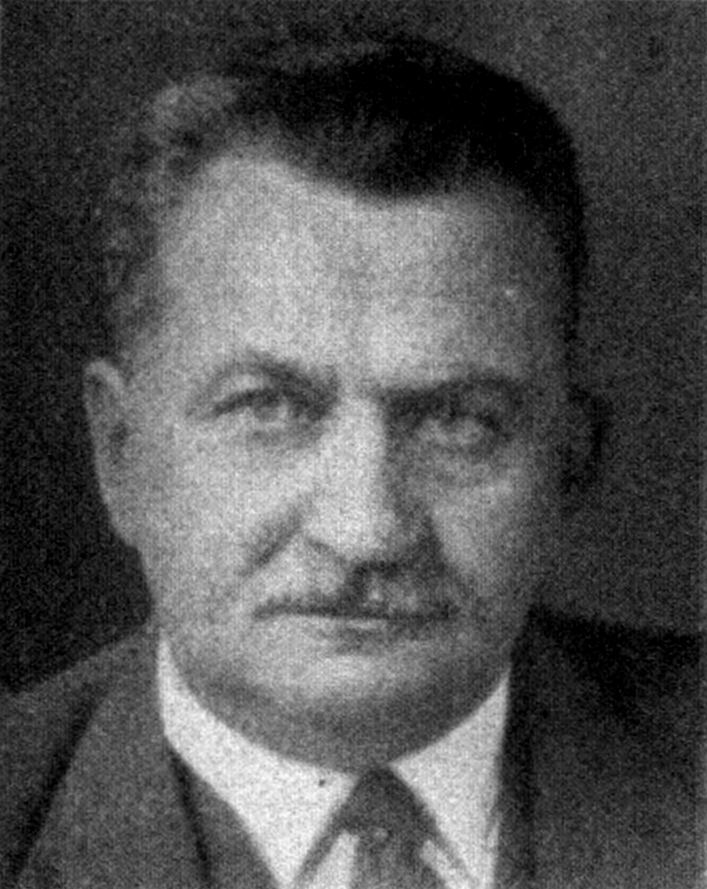
During the debate on the Enabling Act, Social Democrat chairman Otto Wels spoke the last free words in the Reichstag: "Freedom and life can be taken from us, but not our honor." The subsequent passage of the Act did away with parliamentary democracy.

- Reichstag Fire Decree. The day after the Reichstag fire, the President of Germany, Paul von Hindenburg, acting at Hitler's request and based on the emergency powers in article 48 of the Weimar Constitution, issued the Reichstag Fire Decree (28 February 1933). This decree, formally titled "Decree of the Reich President for the Protection of People and State", suspended most civil rights and civil liberties enshrined in the constitution, including the right of habeas corpus, freedom of speech, press, assembly and privacy of communications. This allowed for the arrest of political adversaries, mostly Communists, and for the terrorizing of voters by the Sturmabteilung (SA) (Nazi paramilitary branch) before the upcoming election. It was in this atmosphere that the general election of the Reichstag took place on 5 March 1933. The Nazis had hoped to win an outright majority and push aside their coalition partners, the German National People's Party (DNVP). However, the Nazis won only 43.9 percent of the vote, short of a majority and well below the proportion that would deliver the two-thirds majority required to amend the federal constitution.
- Enabling Act. When the newly-elected Reichstag convened—not including the Communist delegates whose participation in politics had been banned—it passed the Enabling Act (23 March 1933). This law, formally titled "Law to Remedy the Distress of the People and the Reich", gave the government (the Reich Chancellor and his cabinet) the right to enact laws for a period of four years without the involvement of the Reichstag or the Reich President. Under certain circumstances, these laws could "deviate from the Constitution". As a constitutional amendment, it required a two-thirds majority for passage. Even with the proscription of the Communists, the Nazis and their ally the DNVP still controlled well below the number of votes required for this majority. However, through intimidation of deputies (inter alia by surrounding the Reichstag with a cordon of SA members), and through promises of religious freedom protections to the Catholic Centre Party, the required supermajority was obtained. With only the SPD voting in opposition, the Enabling Act passed 444 to 94 through the Reichstag. In practical terms, this Enabling Act meant that the rule of law and democratic protections established by the Weimar Constitution were rendered void. It formed a purportedly legal basis upon which Hitler could effectively circumvent the constitutional framework of the Weimar Republic and impose his will on the nation by decree. For all intents and purposes, it converted his government into a dictatorship.
- Provisional Law on the Coordination of the States with the Reich. Enacted by the Reich government using the Enabling Act, the "Provisional Law on the Coordination of the States with the Reich" (31 March 1933) dissolved the sitting parliaments of all German states except the recently elected Prussian parliament, which the Nazis already controlled. It also ordered the state parliaments reconstituted based on the state votes cast in the 5 March Reichstag election (except for Communist seats, which were not filled). Under this provision, the Nazis and their DNVP partners were able to attain working majorities in all the parliaments. It further mandated the simultaneous dissolution of all state parliaments after the Reichstag was dissolved. It also gave the state governments the same powers to enact legislation that the Reich government possessed under the Enabling Act.
- Second Law on the Coordination of the States with the Reich. In order to further extend its power over the German states, the Reich government enacted the "Second Law on the Coordination of the States with the Reich" (7 April 1933). This measure deployed one Reichsstatthalter ('Reich Governor') in each state. These officers, appointed by the President on the recommendation of the Chancellor, were responsible to Interior Minister Wilhelm Frick and were intended to act as local proconsuls in each state, with near-complete control over the state governments. They were empowered to preside over meetings of the state government, appoint and dismiss the state minister-president as well as other high officials and judges, dissolve the state parliament, call new elections, and promulgate state laws. The law conferred the office of Reichsstatthalter in Prussia on the Reich Chancellor himself.
- Law for the Restoration of a Professional Civil Service. Another measure of Nazi Gleichschaltung was the enactment of the "Law for the Restoration of a Professional Civil Service" (7 April 1933), which mandated the "co-ordination" of the civil service—which in Germany included not only bureaucrats, but also schoolteachers, professors, judges, prosecutors, and other professionals—at the federal, state and municipal level. The law authorized the removal of Jews and Communists from civil service positions, with only limited exceptions for those who had fought in the First World War or had lost a father or son in combat.
- Law on the Trustees of Labour. On 2 May 1933, trade union offices were attacked and occupied by SA stormtroopers. The offices were closed, their newspapers shuttered, funds confiscated and leaders arrested. In order to impose coordination on private sector workers, the Law on the Trustees of Labour (19 May 1933) created new regional positions known as Trustees of Labour, each of which was assigned to one of thirteen large economic areas (Wirtschaftsgebiete). They were charged with ensuring industrial peace and regulating employment contracts, including the setting of wages and the resolution of employer-employee disputes. This effectively supplanted collective bargaining, industrial action and strikes, as the trustees were authorized to impose legally binding settlements.
- Law Against the Formation of Parties. The Communist Party had effectively been outlawed in all but name by the Reichstag Fire Decree, and was completely banned from 6 March. Following additional months of violence and intimidation against the Social Democratic Party, the government seized all its assets, and banned it outright on 22 June 1933, canceling all SPD electoral mandates in both the Reichstag and the state parliaments. By early July, all other parties, even the Nazis' erstwhile allies the DNVP had been intimidated into dissolving themselves rather than face arrests and concentration camp imprisonment. Thus the DNVP (27 June), the German State Party (28 June), the Bavarian People's Party (4 July), the German People's Party (4 July) and the Centre Party (5 July) all formally disbanded. The "Law Against the Formation of Parties" (14 July 1933) then declared the NSDAP as the country's only legal political party, formalizing what had already been accomplished through the campaign of Nazi terror and the complete capitulation of the opposition.
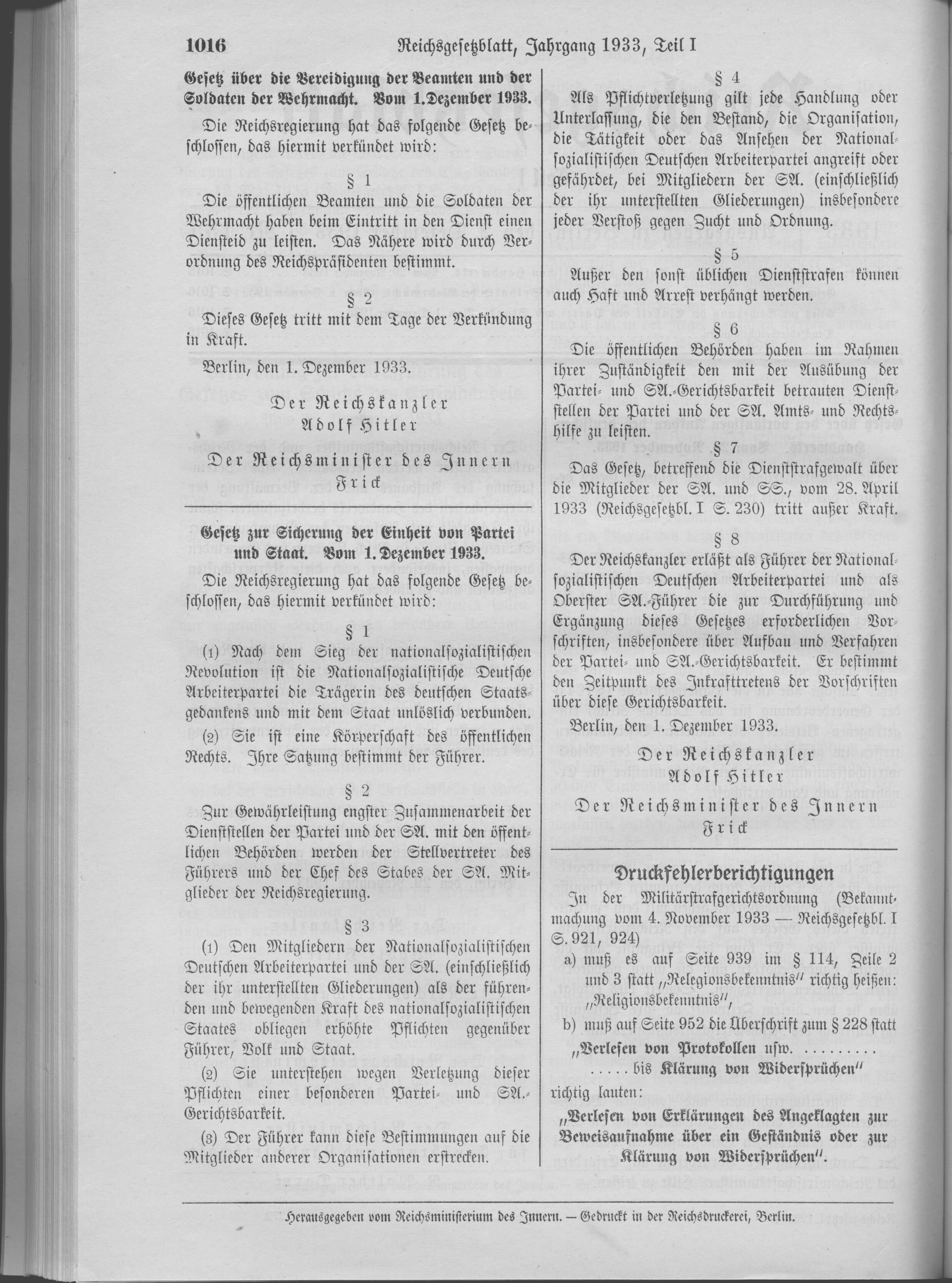
  Promulgation of the "Law to Secure the Unity of Party and State" in the Reichsgesetzblatt of 2 December 1933
- Law to Secure the Unity of Party and State. With the Nazi Party as the only remaining legal party, Hitler then sought to extend the Party's grasp over all the levers of state power and administration through the "Law to Secure the Unity of Party and State" (1 December 1933), which was enacted by the Reich government under the provisions of the Enabling Act. The Law established the Nazi Party as a statutory or public corporation, with jurisdiction over its members. The Party and the SA became official organs of the German Reich. The Deputy Führer of the Party (Rudolf Hess) and the Stabschef of the SA (Ernst Röhm) were made ex officio members of the Reich government as ministers without portfolio, further interlocking the leadership of the Party and State. Government agencies, including public safety and law enforcement authorities such as the police, public prosecutors and the courts, were obligated to provide the Party and the SA with administrative and legal information and investigatory assistance. Party courts (Parteigerichte) received the status of official legal institutions of the State and any crime committed against the Party now was considered a crime against the State. These courts were now authorized to impose detention or imprisonment as punishment.
- Law on the Reconstruction of the Reich. All the state parliaments had been dissolved (along with the Reichstag) on 14 October 1933. While new Reichstag elections took place on 12 November, no new state parliamentary elections were scheduled. Now, on the one-year anniversary of coming to power, the Reich government had the Reichstag pass by a unanimous vote the "Law on the Reconstruction of the Reich" (30 January 1934). This was one of only seven laws passed by the Reichstag in the 19 sessions held during the entire Nazi regime, as opposed to 986 laws enacted solely by the Reich government (Hitler and his cabinet) under the authority of the Enabling Act. The Reconstruction Law, in the form of a constitutional amendment, formally did away with the concept of a federal republic. The state parliaments were abolished altogether and state sovereignty passed to the Reich government. The states, though not themselves eliminated, were reduced to mere administrative bodies subordinated to the Reich, effectively converting Germany into a highly centralized unitary state. By destroying the autonomy of the historic German states, Hitler achieved what Bismarck, Wilhelm II and the Weimar Republic had never dared to attempt.
- Law on the Abolition of the Reichsrat. Within two weeks of the abolition of the state parliaments, the Reich government enacted the "Law on the Abolition of the Reichsrat" (14 February 1934), which formally abolished the Reichsrat, the second or upper chamber of the national parliament that represented the states. This was a clear violation of the Enabling Act: whilst Article 2 of the Enabling Act allowed the government to pass laws that deviated from the Constitution, it explicitly protected the existence of the Reichstag and Reichsrat.
- Law Concerning the Head of State of the German Reich. With Reich President von Hindenburg fatally ill, the Reich government enacted the "Law Concerning the Head of State of the German Reich" (1 August 1934). This law was signed by the entire Reich cabinet. It combined the office of Reich President with that of Reich Chancellor under the title of "Führer and Reich Chancellor", and was drawn up to become effective on the death of the Reich President, which occurred the next day. Again, this flagrantly violated Article 2 of the Enabling Act, which forbade interference with the office of the Reich President. On 2 August 1934, Hitler thus became Germany's head of state and commander-in-chief of the armed forces, while maintaining his power as head of government (head of the executive). Less than 19 months after Hitler first became Chancellor, this Law also removed the last possible mechanism by which Hitler could be legally removed from office, and with it all checks on his power.

== Coordination of the German Länder ==
While the German states were not formally abolished (excluding Mecklenburg-Strelitz in 1934 and Lübeck in 1937), their constitutional rights and sovereignty were eroded and ultimately ended. Prussia was already under federal administration when Hitler came to power, providing a model for the process.

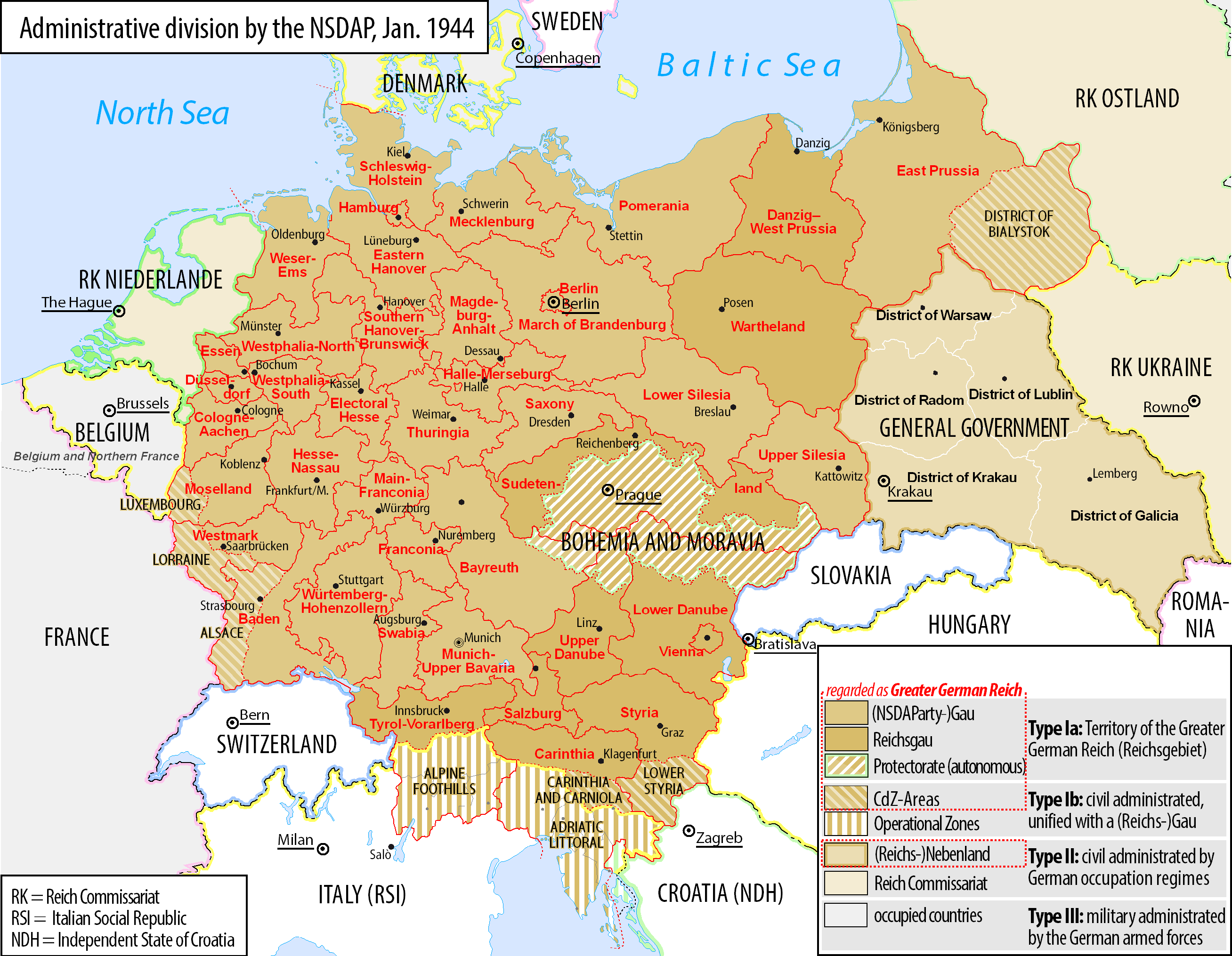
The Nazi Party Gaue effectively replaced the federal government structure.

When Hitler was appointed Reich Chancellor on 30 January 1933, the Nazi Party held the leadership of only four of the 17 German Länder ('states'), i.e., Anhalt, Oldenburg, Mecklenburg-Schwerin and Thuringia. But the Nazis acted swiftly to eliminate any potential centers of opposition in the remaining states. Immediately after the Reichstag election of 5 March 1933, the central government began in earnest its campaign to take over the state governments it did not yet control, and within a very short period it achieved dominance over the administration in every state.

The pattern was in each case similar: pressure on the non-Nazi state governments to place a National Socialist in charge of the police; threatening demonstrations from SA and SS troops in the big cities; the symbolic raising of the swastika banner on town halls; the capitulation with hardly any resistance of the elected governments; the imposition of a Reich Commissar under the pretext of restoring order ... Despite the semblance of legality, the usurpation of the powers of the Länder by the Reich was a plain breach of the Constitution. Force and pressure by the Nazi organizations themselves—political blackmail—had been solely responsible for creating the 'unrest' that had prompted the alleged restorations of 'order'. The terms of the emergency decree of 28 February provided no justification since there was plainly no need for defence from any 'communist acts of violence endangering the state'. The only such acts were those of the Nazis themselves.

Most coalition cabinets that the Nazis formed were with the participation of their conservative nationalist ally, the German National People's Party (DNVP). The "Law Against the Founding of New Parties" (14 July 1933) banned all parties except the Nazi Party. The DNVP members of the remaining coalition cabinets eventually either joined the Party or were replaced by Nazis, resulting in one-party government in all the Länder.

The following table presents an overview of the process of Gleichschaltung as it was applied to the Nazification of the German Länder governments. While, strictly speaking, Gleichschaltung did not start until after the Nazi seizure of power at the Reich level at the end of January 1933, the table also presents earlier Nazi Party successes in infiltrating and taking charge of several German state administrations during 1930–1932. In most of these instances, they took the portfolio of the state interior ministries from which they controlled the police, installing Nazi adherents and purging opponents.

Key:	Entered into a coalition government led by a non-Nazi	Formed a coalition government led by a Nazi	Formed an all-Nazi government

Nazi seizure of power in the Länder
Länder	Date	Event
Thuringia	23 January 1930	First Nazi enters a coalition cabinet with Wilhelm Frick appointed Minister of the Interior and Public Education
Thuringia	26 August 1932	Nazi-led coalition cabinet formed under Minister-President Fritz Sauckel
Brunswick	1 October 1930	Nazis enter coalition cabinet with Anton Franzen appointed Minister of the Interior and Public Education
Brunswick	9 May 1933	All Nazi cabinet formed under Minister-President Dietrich Klagges
Mecklenburg-Strelitz	8 April 1932	Nazis enter coalition cabinet with Fritz Stichtenoth appointed Staatsrat ('State Councillor')
Mecklenburg-Strelitz	29 May 1933	All-Nazi cabinet formed under Minister of State Fritz Stichtenoth
Anhalt	21 May 1932	First Nazi-led coalition cabinet formed under Minister-President Alfred Freyberg
Oldenburg	16 June 1932	First all-Nazi cabinet formed under Minister-President Carl Röver
Mecklenburg-Schwerin	13 July 1932	All-Nazi cabinet formed under Minister-President Walter Granzow
Prussia	30 January 1933	Nazis enter coalition cabinet formed under Reichskommissar Franz von Papen; Hermann Göring becomes Minister of the Interior
Prussia	11 April 1933	Nazi-led coalition cabinet formed under Minister-President Hermann Göring
Lippe	7 February 1933	Nazi-led coalition cabinet formed under Chairman of the Landespräsidien ('State Presidency') Ernst Krappe
Hamburg	8 March 1933	Nazi-led coalition cabinet formed under Senate President and Bürgermeister Carl Vincent Krogmann
Schaumburg-Lippe	8 March 1933	Appointment of Reichskommissar Kurt Matthaei; on 1 April, an all-Nazi cabinet formed under State Councillor Hans-Joachim Riecke
Bavaria	10 March 1933	All-Nazi cabinet formed under Reichskommissar Franz Ritter von Epp
Saxony	10 March 1933	Nazi-led coalition cabinet formed under Reichskommissar Manfred Freiherr von Killinger
Baden	10 March 1933	All-Nazi cabinet formed under Reichskommissar Robert Heinrich Wagner
Lübeck	11 March 1933	Appointment of Reichskommissar Friedrich Völtzer; on 31 May, Otto-Heinrich Drechsler named Senate President and Bürgermeister
Hesse	13 March 1933	All-Nazi cabinet formed under Staatspräsident Ferdinand Werner
Württemberg	15 March 1933	Nazi-led coalition cabinet formed under Minister-President Wilhelm Murr
Bremen	18 March 1933	All-Nazi cabinet formed under Senate President and acting Bürgermeister Richard Markert

== Propaganda and societal integration ==
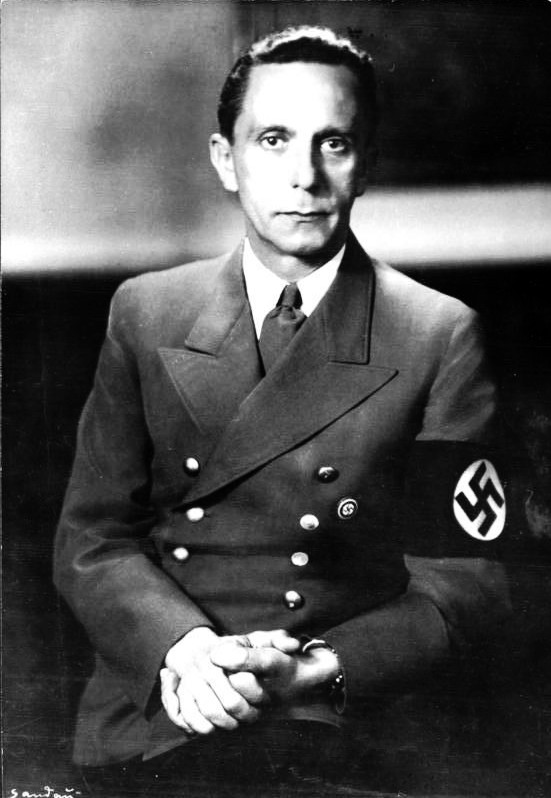
Joseph Goebbels in 1942

One of the most critical steps towards Gleichschaltung of German society was the introduction of the "Ministry of Public Enlightenment and Propaganda" under Joseph Goebbels in March 1933 and the subsequent steps the Propaganda Ministry took to assume complete control of the press and all means of social communication. This included oversight of newspapers, magazines, films, books, public meetings and ceremonies, foreign press relations, theater, art and music, radio, and television. To this end, Goebbels said:

[T]he secret of propaganda [is to] permeate the person it aims to grasp, without his even noticing that he is being permeated. Of course propaganda has a purpose, but the purpose must be concealed with such cleverness and virtuosity that the person on whom this purpose is to be carried out doesn't notice it at all.

This was also the purpose of "co-ordination": to ensure that every aspect of the lives of German citizens was permeated with the ideas and prejudices of the Nazis. From March to July 1933 and continuing afterward, the Nazi Party systematically eliminated or co-opted non-Nazi organizations that could potentially influence people. Those critical of Hitler and the Nazis were suppressed, intimidated, or murdered.

Every national voluntary association, and every local club, was brought under Nazi control, from industrial and agricultural pressure groups to sports associations, football clubs, male voice choirs, women's organizations—in short, the whole fabric of associational life was Nazified. Rival, politically oriented clubs or societies were merged into a single Nazi body. Existing leaders of voluntary associations were either unceremoniously ousted, or knuckled under of their own accord. Many organizations expelled leftish or liberal members and declared their allegiance to the new state and its institutions. The whole process ... went on all over Germany. ... By the end, virtually the only non-Nazi associations left were the army and the Churches with their lay organizations.

For example, in 1934, the government founded the Deutscher Reichsbund für Leibesübungen (German Reich League for Bodily Exercise), later the Nationalsozialistischer Reichsbund für Leibesübungen, as the official sports governing body. All other German sport associations gradually lost their freedom and were co-opted into it. Besides sports, another more important part of the "co-ordination" effort was the purging of the civil service, both at the Federal and state level. Top Federal civil servants—the State Secretaries—were largely replaced if they were not sympathetic to the Nazi program, as were the equivalent bureaucrats in the states, but Nazification took place at every level. Civil servants rushed to join the Nazi Party, fearing they would lose their jobs if they did not. At the local level, mayors and councils were terrorized by Nazi stormtroopers of the SA and SS into resigning or following orders to replace officials and workers at local public institutions who were Jewish or belonged to other political parties.

The Gleichschaltung also included the formation of various organizations with compulsory membership for segments of the population, particularly the youth of Germany. Boys first served as apprentices in the Pimpfen ('cubs'), beginning at the age of six, and at age ten, entered the Deutsches Jungvolk ('Young German Boys') and served there until joining the Hitler Youth proper at age fourteen. Boys remained there until age eighteen, at which time they entered into the Arbeitsdienst ('Labor Service') and the armed forces. Girls became part of the Jungmädel ('Young Maidens') at age ten and at age fourteen were enrolled in the Bund Deutscher Mädel ('League of German Maidens'). At eighteen, BDM members generally went to the eastern territory for their Pflichtdienst, or Landjahr, a year of labor on a farm. By 1940, membership in the Hitler Youth numbered some eight million.

== Coordination of the trade union movement ==
The German trade union movement had a long history, dating to the mid-nineteenth-century. At the time of the Weimar Republic, its largest grouping was the General German Trade Union Federation (ADGB). This was an umbrella organization that was formed in July 1919 and was originally composed of 52 unions with about 8 million workers. It was generally affiliated with the Social Democratic Party (SPD) and was on the left of the political spectrum. In March 1920, it was instrumental in calling a general strike that led to the collapse of the right-wing Kapp Putsch that attempted to overthrow the republic. It was led from January 1921 by Theodor Leipart. Following the economic downturn of 1929, the resulting sharp rise in unemployment caused a large drop-off in membership but, by 1932, it still represented an estimated 3.5 million workers in some 30 unions.

When the Nazis came to power at the end of January 1933, there was some sentiment for a general strike by SPD politicians and trade unionists, but the national leadership was wary of such an action in the face of the worst unemployment crisis the nation had experienced. Though there were some sporadic isolated incidents, no general policy of resistance was undertaken. The Nazis embarked on a policy of violence and intimidation against all their opponents, including the SPD-affiliated trade unions. In an effort to safeguard his organization and its members, Leipart declared the ADBG politically "neutral" within weeks of the Nazis coming to power. Meanwhile, Party leaders convinced conservative elements among the police, the judiciary, prison administrators and civil servants that suppression of the labor movement was justified.

Following the Nazi gains in the Reichstag election of 5 March 1933, violent episodes increased in intensity, with SA stormtroopers ransacking trade union offices, assaulting staff, destroying furniture and equipment, stealing funds and burning documents. By 25 March, union offices in some 45 towns throughout the Reich had been attacked. At this point, the trade unions began to distance themselves from the SPD in an attempt to seek an accommodation with the regime. On 28 April, the ADGB agreed to move toward unification with the conservative Christian and the bourgeois liberal trade union groups, to form a single national labor organization in the new Nazi state. Leipart also supported the announcement by Goebbels that May Day would be celebrated as a public holiday for the first time, a long-sought goal of the labor movement. But any efforts at reconciliation on the unions' part proved futile, as the Nazis had already begun to plot a complete takeover of the trade union movement, as demonstrated by Goebbels's diary entry of 17 April:

On 1 May we shall arrange May Day as a grandiose demonstration of the German people's will. On 2 May the trade union offices will be occupied. Coordination in this area too. There might possibly be a row for a few days, but then they will belong to us. We must make no allowances anymore. ... Once the trade unions are in our hands the other parties and organizations will not be able to hold out for much longer.

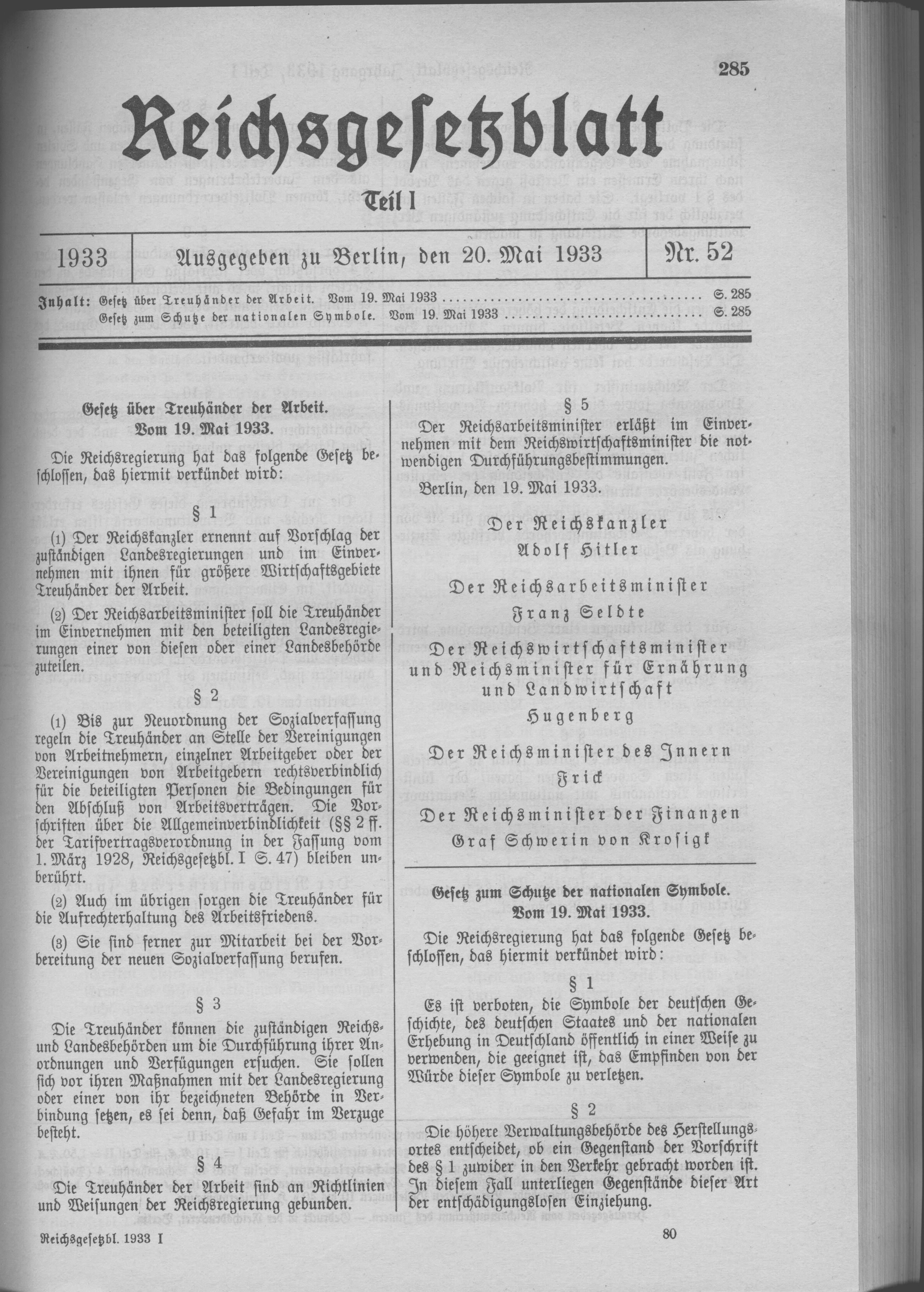
Promulgation of the Law on the Trustees of Labour in the Reichsgesetzblatt of 20 May 1933

Accordingly, 1 May 1933 was declared the Day of National Labor, a day of parades, speeches and propaganda displays to celebrate the unity of the German labor movement with the nation, featuring SA military bands, swastika flags and fireworks. It culminated with a huge rally and speech by Hitler at Berlin Tempelhof Airport that was attended by over one million people. Many workers, particularly those in state employment, were compelled to participate by threats of dismissal for not attending. The next day, as Goebbels had indicated, the German labor movement was crushed under a wave of unprecedented violence at the hands of SA and SS troops. All SPD-supported trade union offices were occupied, their newspapers and periodicals were discontinued, their banks and credit unions were closed, and their assets were confiscated and turned over to the National Socialist Factory Cell Organization. Leipart and other union leaders were taken into "protective custody" and sent to concentration camps. Violence was inflicted on many and, in the most brutal incident, four union officials were beaten to death in Duisburg.

Two days later, other non-SPD-aligned union amalgamations, such as the conservative German National Association of Commercial Employees and the liberal Hirsch-Dunckersche Gewerkvereine, placed themselves under the Action Committee for the Protection of German Labor, headed by Robert Ley, the Stabschef ('chief of staff') of the Nazi Party organization. The last remaining union umbrella agency, the Christian-oriented Deutscher Gewerkschaftsbund was absorbed at the end of June. Throughout this process, there were no strikes, no demonstrations and no protests. Even the Nazis were surprised. The most highly organized and powerful trade union movement in Europe offered no resistance and disappeared virtually overnight.

In its place, the German Labor Front (German: Deutsche Arbeitsfront or DAF), a Nazi Party organization led by Ley, was established on 10 May. Its goal was coordination of the entire labor force under Nazi leadership. On 19 May, the government enacted the Law on the Trustees of Labor that decreed an end to collective bargaining. It established Trustees of Labour, who were appointed by Hitler and charged with regulating labor contracts and maintaining labor peace. Since their decisions were legally binding, strikes were effectively outlawed.

=== Strength Through Joy ===
An all-embracing recreational organization for workers, called Kraft durch Freude ("Strength Through Joy"), was set up under the auspices of the German Labor Front. Hobbies were regimented and all private clubs, whether chess, football, or woodworking, were brought under the control of Strength Through Joy, which also provided vacation trips, skiing, swimming, concerts, and ocean cruises. Some 43 million Germans enjoyed trips via the Strength Through Joy initiative. This effort inspired the idea of Germans acquiring automobiles and the construction of the Autobahn. It was the largest of the many organizations the Nazis established and a propaganda success. Workers were also brought in line with the party through activities such as the Reichsberufswettkampf, a national vocational competition. Many unemployed people were also drafted into the Reich Labor Service, where they were given uniforms and tools and put to work; the disappearance of unemployed people from the streets contributed to the perception that the Nazis were improving Germany's economic conditions.

== Implications ==
Historian Claudia Koonz explains that the word Gleichschaltung stems from the arena of electricity, where it refers to converting power from alternating current to direct current, which is called "rectification" in English; the word Gleichschaltung translates literally as "phasing". Used in its sociopolitical sense, Gleichschaltung has no equivalent in any other language. The Nazis also used other similar terms, such as Ausschaltung, which constituted the removal or "switching off" of anyone who stained or soiled the German nation. This seemingly clinical terminology captured both the mechanical and biological meaning for members of German society; as one German citizen visiting London explained, "It means the same stream will flow through the ethnic body politic [Volkskörper]."

Former Technical University of Dresden professor of romance languages Viktor Klemperer—dismissed from his post for being Jewish in 1935—collected a list of terms Nazis employed in everyday speech, which he discussed in his book, LTI – Lingua Tertii Imperii, published in English as The Language of the Third Reich. In this work, Klemperer contends that the Nazis made the German language itself a servant to their ideology through its repetitive use, eventually permeating its people's very "flesh and blood". For instance, if it was sunny and pleasant, it was "Hitler weather", or if one failed to comply with Nazi ideals of racial and social conformity, they were "switched off." While the state imposed top-down coordination, many Germans simultaneously engaged in bottom-up alignment of the individual type, known as Selbstgleichschaltung.

When the blatant emphasis on racial hatred of others seemed to reach an impasse in the school system, through radio broadcasts, or on film reels, the overseers of Nazi Gleichschaltung propaganda switched to strategies that focused more on togetherness and the "we-consciousness" of the collective Volk, but the mandates of Nazi "coordination" remained: pay homage to the Führer, expel all foreigners, sacrifice for the German people, and welcome future challenges. While greater German social and economic unity was produced through the regime's Gleichschaltung initiatives, it was at the expense of individuality and to the social detriment of any nonconformist; worse, it contributed to and reinforced the social and racial exclusion of anyone National Socialist doctrine deemed an enemy. The Nazi Gleichschaltung or "synchronization" of German society—along with a series of Nazi legislation—was part and parcel to Jewish economic disenfranchisement, the violence against political opposition, the creation of concentration camps, the Nuremberg Laws, the establishment of a racial Volksgemeinschaft, the seeking of Lebensraum, and the violent mass destruction of human life deemed somehow less valuable by the National Socialist government of Germany.

== See also ==
- Denazification
- Führerprinzip
- Glossary of Nazi Germany
- Organic theory of the state
