= Generalbezirk Lettland =

Nazi German occupation regime in Latvia 1941-1944

Generalbezirk Lettland Latvian: Latvijas ģenerālapgabals
- Generalbezirk of Reichskommissariat Ostland
- 1941–1944
- Flag of Nazi Germany Emblem

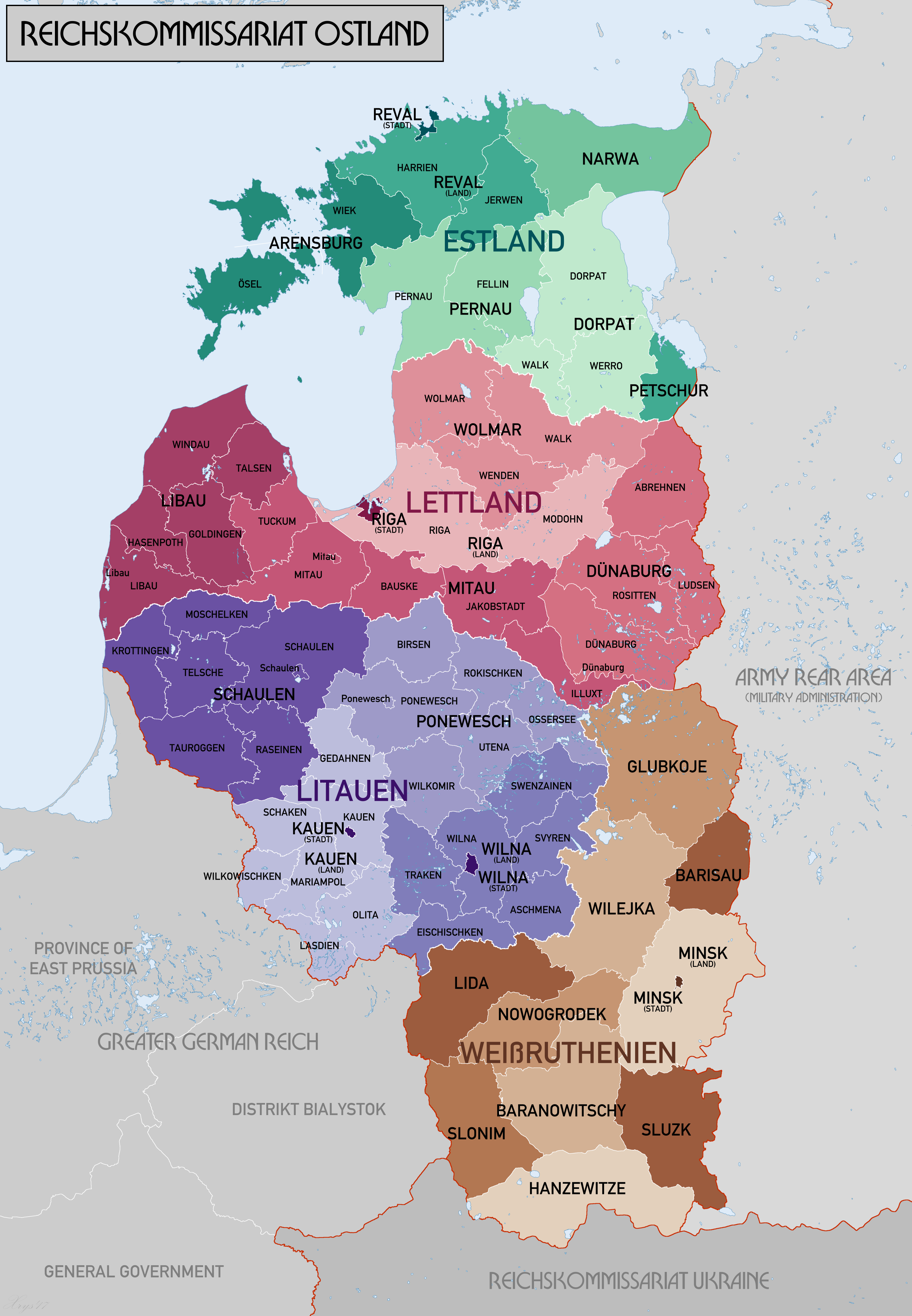
- Map of Generalbezirk Lettland (in shades of pink) within the Reichskommissariat Ostland
- Capital: Riga
- Government: Civil administration
- Generalkommissar
  - 1941-1944: Otto-Heinrich Drechsler
- SS and Police Leader
  - 1941-1944: Walther Schröder
- Historical era: World War II
  - Established: 25 July 1941
  - Dissolved: 13 October 1944
Preceded by
Army Group North Rear Area
- Today part of: Latvia

Generalbezirk Lettland (German for "General District Latvia"; Latvian: Latvijas ģenerālapgabals) was an administrative subdivision of the Reichskommissariat Ostland of Nazi Germany that covered Latvia from 1941 to 1944. It served as the Nazi civilian administration for the German occupation of Latvia during World War II, and supervised the collaborationist Latvian Self-Administration of Oskars Dankers.

Otto-Heinrich Drechsler was the only Generalkommissar of Generalbezirk Lettland during its existence.

== Organization and structure ==
Generalbezirk Lettland was established in Latvia on 25 July 1941, as one of the administrative districts of Reichskommissariat Ostland along with Generalbezirk Litauen. It was organized on the territory of the German-occupied Latvia, which had until then been under the military administration of the Wehrmacht's Army Group North Rear Area and its commander Franz von Roques during the German invasion of the Soviet Union. By 1 September 1941, in the wake of further German gains, it expanded to its full extent, reaching the borders with Estonia and Russia. The capital of Generalbezirk Lettland was Riga, which also served as the capital of the Reichskommissariat Ostland.

== Administrative divisions ==
Generalbezirk Lettland had 6 subdivisions called Kreisgebiete (County Areas). The seat of administration is in parentheses.

- Dünaburg (Daugavpils)
- Libau (Liepāja)
- Mitau (Jelgava)
- Riga-Land (Riga)
- Riga-Stadt (Riga)
- Wolmar (Valmiera)

== Civil and police leadership ==
Civil administration was led by a Generalkommissar (General Commissioner) directly appointed by Adolf Hitler, and who reported to Ostland Reichskommissar Hinrich Lohse, headquartered in Riga. In addition, police and security matters were overseen by an SS and Police Leader (SSPF) directly appointed by Reichsführer-SS Heinrich Himmler, and who reported to the Higher SS and Police Leader (HSSPF) Ostland und Russland-Nord in Riga, SS-Gruppenführer Hans-Adolf Prützmann until 1 November 1941, and SS-Obergruppenführer Friedrich Jeckeln after that date.

- Generalkommissar: SA-Brigadeführer Otto-Heinrich Drechsler (25 July 1941 – 14 September 1944).
- SS and Police Leader: SS-Brigadeführer Walther Schröder (4 August 1941 – 19 October 1944.

== Holocaust ==
Following the German invasion in June 1941, the death squads of Einsatzgruppe A and their Latvian collaborators, including the Arajs Kommando, immediately began the systematic murder of Latvian Jews. It is estimated that approximately 70,000, or about three-quarters of the pre-war population, were killed. In addition, thousands of Romani people and ethnic Latvians perished in the slaughter. Generalbezirk Lettland was the site of the Rumbula massacre, one of the most notorious mass executions in the eastern occupied territories.

== Dissolution ==
On 14 September 1944, the Red Army launched its Riga Offensive and Drechsler departed for Lübeck in Germany. Riga fell on 13 October and Generalbezirk Lettland effectively ceased to exist. Administration of those parts of Latvia still under German occupation reverted to military administration under Army Group North. Some German forces were trapped in the Courland pocket and continued armed resistance until finally surrendering on 10 May 1945.

== See also ==
- German occupation of Latvia during World War II
- The Holocaust in Latvia
