= Factory community =

Business structure of Nazi Germany

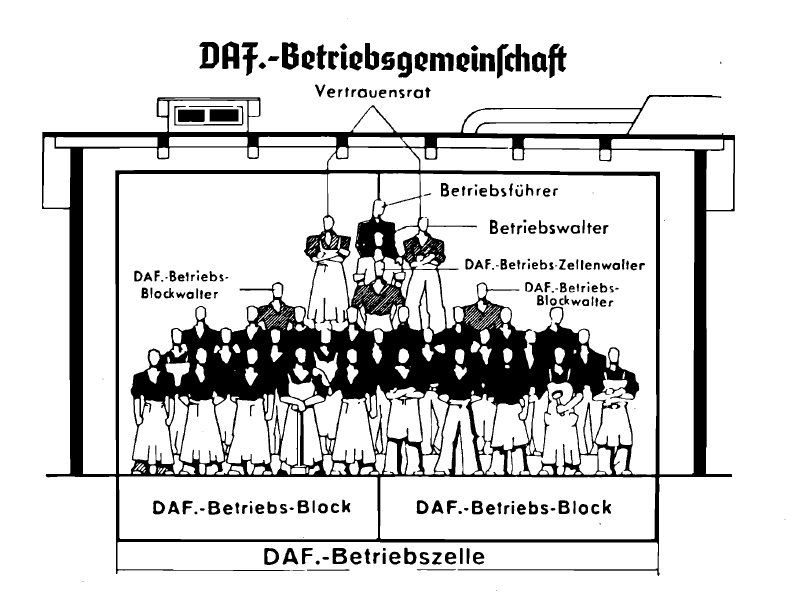
Factory worker organigram of the German Labour Front

A community of factory workers or a business community (German: Betriebsgemeinschaft) comprised the owner, management and work force in businesses and companies in Nazi Germany in accordance with the leader principle (Führerprinzip). The owner/manager was called “main leader” while the employees were considered to be followers (Gefolgschaft). In order to promote a climate of mutual trust and understanding a Council of Trust had to be established under the Labour organization law. This council was elected from a list of candidates set up by the main leader for the factory workers or business community and the German Labour Front overseer (Betriebsobmann). In accordance with Nazi ideology, foreigners and members of minorities considered unworthy of trust, could not be part of the factory community.
