= Richard Markert =

German Nazi Party politician

Reichskommissar Bremen
- In office 6 March 1933 – 18 March 1933
- Preceded by: Office established
- Succeeded by: Office abolished

Bürgermeister and Senate President Bremen
- In office 18 March 1933 – 23 October 1934
- Preceded by: Martin Donandt
- Succeeded by: Otto Heider

Trustee of Labour Lower Saxony
- In office 16 June 1933 – 1935
- Preceded by: Office established

Personal details
- Born: 7 November 1891 Elsterwerda, Province of Saxony, Kingdom of Prussia, German Empire
- Died: 13 April 1957 (aged 65) Cologne, North Rhine-Westphalia, West Germany
- Party: Nazi Party
- Other political affiliations: National Democratic Party of Germany
- Education: Humboldt University of Berlin; University of Leipzig
- Occupation: Labor specialist

Military service
- Allegiance: German Empire
- Branch/service: Imperial German Army
- Years of service: 1914–1918
- Battles/wars: World War I
- Awards: Iron Cross 1st and 2nd class, Albert Order; Order of Merit; Wound Badge

Ernst Otto Richard Markert (7 November 1891 – 13 April 1957) was a Nazi Party politician who, in the first year of Nazi Germany, served as the President of the Senate and the Bürgermeister (mayor) of Bremen. After the end of the Second World War, he settled in East Germany (GDR), joined the pro-GDR National Democratic Party of Germany and became a magistrate. He escaped to West Germany, worked as an in-house counsel to an employers' association and died in Cologne in 1957.

== Early life ==
Markert was born in Elsterwerda, the son of a master baker. He attended Realschule in Großenhain and Weißenfels, obtained his Abitur in 1912 and began to study law, economics and chemical technology at the Humboldt University of Berlin and at the University of Leipzig in Saxony. His studies were interrupted by the First World War, in which he served as an artillery officer from August 1914 to December 1918. He was awarded the Iron Cross, 1st and 2nd class, the Saxon Albert Order, the Saxon Order of Merit and the Wound Badge in black. After the end of the war, Markert resumed his studies in Leipzig where he became a member of the Germania student corps. In 1920 he received his doctorate in political science. He then worked at the I.G. Farben factory in Wolfen as head of the human resources office. In 1929, he left the chemical company and became head of the employment office in Sagan (today, Żagań).

== Nazi Party career in Bremen ==
Markert joined the Nazi Party in 1931 and, on 12 October of that year, he was promoted to Deputy Director of the employment office in Bremen. After the Nazis seized power at the national level, they instituted a policy of Gleichschaltung (coordination) by which they sought to assert their control over all the German Länder. In early March 1933, the Reich government dispatched Reichskommissars to all the German states not yet governed by Nazis, including Bremen. The Reichstag election was held on 5 March 1933 and the Nazis led the field with 32.6% of the vote in Bremen. The next day, 6 March, under pressure from the Nazis, the three Social Democratic members of the governing Senate resigned. Reich Interior Minister Wilhelm Frick appointed Markert as the Reichskommissar for Bremen and entrusted him with authority over the police. Until that time, Markert had played almost no role in the public life of the city. In his new role, on 11 March, he appointed individual Spezialkommissare (special commissioners) to monitor the official actions of the few senators still remaining in office. On 16 March, the remaining Senate members resigned, including Bürgermeister Martin Donandt. Markert was appointed as the Senate President and, thereby, the acting Bürgermeister. On 16 June, Markert also secured a position in the Reich Ministry of Labor as the Trustee of Labour for the Lower Saxony economic region. On 1 October, his position as Bürgermeister was made permanent.

The Second Law on the Coordination of the States with the Reich of 7 April 1933 provided for even more direct central government control of all the Lander through the appointment of a Reichsstatthalter (Reich Governor). Due to its small size, there was no prospect of Bremen having its own governorship, so Markert spoke out on 12 April 1933 in favor of Bremen's close ties to Oldenburg. He saw this as important for the Bremen economy to retain its independence, by avoiding a joint governorship with the much larger seaport of Hamburg, which its Bürgermeister Carl Vincent Krogmann was advocating. Markert instead promoted a joint governorship of Bremen with Oldenburg. On 5 May 1933, Gauleiter Carl Röver of Oldenburg was appointed Reichsstatthalter for Bremen and Oldenburg, and the subordination of Bremen's economic interests to the dominance of Hamburg was averted.

During Markert's tenure as Bürgermeister, the democratic institutions of Bremen were dismantled. On 28 March 1933, Markert dismissed Waldemar Becké, the Oberbürgermeister (Lord Mayor) of the Bremen exclave of Bremerhaven and a member of the German State Party, and replaced him with that city's Nazi Party Kreisleiter, Julius Lorenzen. Additionally, the Bürgerschaft of Bremen, the state's legislative body, was reconstituted on 5 April 1933 on the basis of the recent Reichstag election, giving the Nazis and their conservative ally the German National People's Party a working majority of the seats. It met only once on 28 April 1933, was dissolved on 14 October and no new elections were held. Following passage of the 31 January 1934 Law on the Reconstruction of the Reich, which mandated the assumption of state sovereignty by the Reich and the abolition of all state parliaments, the Bürgerschaft, which had existed since 1849, was abolished.

From March 1934 onward, there were increasing conflicts between Markert and Röver, especially when the latter sought to have Bremen become a Regierungsbezirk (government district) of Oldenburg. Markert, on the other hand, advocated for Bremen to be separated from the joint governorship with Oldenburg, which earned Röver's enmity. This eventually brought about the end of Markert's political career, as he was removed from his executive offices in Bremen on 23 October 1934 and was replaced by Otto Heider. In 1935, Markert was also released from his post as a Trustee of Labour. He then returned to work in the private sector and, from 1938 to 1945, as a self-employed export merchant in Berlin.

== Post-war life ==
After the end of the Second World War, Markert was interned for a time, but was ultimately released and returned to work as an export merchant. He became a member of the National Democratic Party of Germany and an executive magistrate in East Berlin, attaining the position of Magistrate Director for Public Education in 1950. In that year, he joined twenty-two other prominent former-Nazis in signing an open letter to "all former members of the Nazi Party, officers and professional soldiers" residing in West Germany, asking that they join in a Communist-sponsored manifesto against the atomic bomb. The following year, Markert was convicted of illicit trading in securities and sentenced to three years in prison. However, he managed to escape to West Berlin and, from 1954, he worked as a consultant for an employers' association in Cologne. Markert died on 13 April 1957 in Cologne at the age of 65.

== See also ==
- History of Bremen (city)

== Sources ==
- Broszat, Martin (1981). The Hitler State: The Foundation and Development of the Internal Structure of the Third Reich. New York: Longman Inc. ISBN 978-0-582-48997-4.
- Childers, Thomas (2017). The Third Reich: A History of Nazi Germany. New York: Simon & Schuster. ISBN 978-1-45165-113-3.
- Das Deutsche Führerlexikon 1934-1935. Berlin: Verlagsanftalt Otto Stollberg G. m. b. H. 1934.
- Dvorak, Helge: (2000) Biographisches Lexikon der Deutschen Burschenschaft. Band I: Politiker. Teilband 4: M–Q.. Heidelberg: Winter, S. 29–30. ISBN 978-3-825-31118-6.
- Pfliegensdörfer, Dieter: (1986) Vom Handelszentrum zur Rüstungsschmiede. Wirtschaft, Staat und Arbeiterklasse in Bremen von 1929 bis 1945. Bremen: Universität Bremen Forschungsschwerpunkt Arbeit und Bildung.
- Schwarzwälder, Herbert: (2003) Das Große Bremen-Lexikon. Edition Temmen, ISBN 3-86108-693-X.
