= Kurt Matthaei =

German Nazi Party politician

Reichskommissar Free State of Schaumburg-Lippe
- In office 8 March 1933 – 1 April 1933
- Preceded by: Heinrich Lorenz (State Councilor)
- Succeeded by: Hans-Joachim Riecke

Regierungspräsident Münster Region
- In office 5 July 1933 – 21 October 1934
- Preceded by: Hermann Pünder
- Succeeded by: Kurt Klemm

Regierungspräsident Lüneburg Region
- In office 1 November 1934 – March 1944
- Preceded by: Franz Hermann Reschke
- Succeeded by: Fritz Herrmann

Personal details
- Born: 4 February 1886 Nienburg, Province of Hanover, Kingdom of Prussia, German Empire
- Died: 19 March 1974 (aged 88) Lüneburg, Lower Saxony, West Germany
- Party: Nazi Party
- Other political affiliations: Socialist Reich Party; Deutsche Reichspartei; National Democratic Party
- Education: University of Göttingen; University of Münster
- Profession: Lawyer

Military service
- Allegiance: German Empire
- Branch/service: Imperial German Army
- Years of service: 1911–1912; 1914–1918
- Rank: Leutnant
- Unit: 13th (1st Westphalian) Infantry Regiment; 57th (8th Westphalian) Infantry Regiment
- Battles/wars: World War I
- Awards: Iron Cross, 2nd class Wound Badge

Franz Georg Kurt Matthaei (4 February 1886 – 19 March 1974) was a German lawyer and a Nazi Party politician that was active in the takeover of the government of the state of Schaumburg-Lippe and then served as the head of several governmental districts in Nazi Germany. He was a supporter of several neo-Nazi political parties in post-war Germany.

== Early life ==
Kurt Matthaei was born in Nienburg, the son of the Oberbürgermeister of Hamm. He attended the Hamm Gymnasium and obtained his Abitur in 1907. He then studied law and political science at the University of Göttingen and the University of Münster. He passed the first state law examination in July 1911 and began his training as a Referendar (lawyer trainee) at the district court in Warendorf. Between 1911 and 1912, he fulfilled his military service obligation as a one-year volunteer with the 13th (1st Westphalian) Infantry Regiment, headquartered at Münster. At the outbreak of the First World War, he reentered the Imperial German Army as an officer candidate and fought on the western front. He was wounded in the First Battle of the Marne in September 1914 and was commissioned as a Leutnant in October. He served as a company commander and was wounded again at the Battle of Verdun in August 1916. Awarded the Iron Cross, 2nd class, he served as a military lawyer and was discharged after the end of the war in November 1918. From 1 June 1919, he worked as the head of welfare in the Landkreis Dortmund, which was incorporated into the city of Dortmund in April 1928. On 1 May 1930, he lost his job due to his political views. He entered politics and was elected as an alderman in Marl.

== Nazi Party career ==
On 1 November 1932, Matthaei became a member of the Nazi Party. After the Nazi seizure of power at the national level, they began the process of assuming control of all the Länder in a process that came to be known as Gleichschaltung (coordination). In early March 1933, the Reich government dispatched Reichskommissars to all the German states not yet governed by Nazis. On 8 March 1933, Wilhelm Frick, the Reich Interior Minister appointed Matthaei as the Reichskommissar for the Free State of Schaumburg-Lippe and entrusted him with the exercise of police powers. This provoked the resignation of the existing state government of the Social Democrat Heinrich Lorenz. Matthaei also was elected to the provincial parliament of the Province of Westphalia and was appointed as the state's plenipotentiary to the Reichsrat, where he would represent the state's interests at the national legislature.

On 1 April 1933, after a Nazi government under Hans-Joachim Riecke had been installed, Matthaei left Schaumburg-Lippe to become the Landrat (district administrator) in the Recklinghausen District. In addition, he was appointed as a deputy member to the Prussian State Council where he would serve until that body's dissolution on 8 July 1933. On 5 July 1933, he was advanced to the post of the Regierungspräsident (government president) of the Münster Region. From 1933 to 1935, he also served as the chairman of the Main Committee of the German Association for Public and Private Welfare. Due to disagreements with the Party leadership of Gau Westphalia-North over his positive attitude toward Christianity, on 21 October 1934 he was removed from his post in Münster and transferred to become the president of the Lüneburg District on 1 November. While in Lüneburg, he also was the chairman of the regional Nazi Party court from 1936 to 1938 and, from December 1939 to March 1941, the representative of the Nazi Party Office of Racial Policy. During the Second World War, Matthaei was assigned as a special representative of the leadership staff of Kiev (today, Kyiv) in the Reichskommissariat Ukraine from July 1943 until March 1944 when he retired from his posts and settled in Dannenberg.

== Postwar political activity ==
After the end of the war, Matthaei was interned by the British, from 1945 until October 1947. After a denazification proceeding, he was initially classified in Category III (lesser offender) in October 1948 but was exonerated in March 1951. He joined the neo-Nazi Socialist Reich Party (SRP), became a district leader and unsuccessfully ran for a seat in the Landtag of Lower Saxony. In October 1952, the SRP was banned as a Nazi successor organization by the Federal Constitutional Court. Matthaei then joined another neo-Nazi party, the Deutsche Reichspartei (DRP). In the Bundestag election of September 1953, despite being considered the strongest candidate that they fielded, he was soundly defeated for a seat from Lower Saxony. At the 1957 election, he again failed to be elected. In 1958, he was a founding member of the Free Socialist People's Party. Finally, he joined the National Democratic Party (NPD), the DRP's successor party that was established in 1964. Matthaei died in Lüneburg in March 1974.

== Sources ==
- Childers, Thomas (2017). The Third Reich: A History of Nazi Germany. New York: Simon & Schuster. ISBN 978-1-45165-113-3.
- Das Deutsche Führerlexikon 1934-1935. Berlin: Verlagsanftalt Otto Stollberg G. m. b. H. 1934.
- Haunfelder, Bernd: (2006) Die münsterischen Regierungspräsidenten des 20. Jahrhunderts. Bezirksregierung Münster.
- Klee, Ernst (2007). Das Personenlexikon zum Dritten Reich. Wer war was vor und nach 1945. Frankfurt-am-Main: Fischer-Taschenbuch-Verlag. ISBN 978-3-596-16048-8.
- Lilla, Joachim (2005). Der Preußische Staatsrat 1921–1933: Ein biographisches Handbuch. Düsseldorf: Droste Verlag. ISBN 978-3-770-05271-4.
- Schumacher, Martin (Hrsg.): (2006) M.d.B. – Die Volksvertretung 1946–1972. Kommission für Geschichte des Parlamentarismus und der politischen Parteien e. V., Berlin, ISBN 3-7700-5224-2, S. 796–797, Kurt Matthaei entry, p. 796.
