= Trustee of Labour =

Labour officials in Nazi Germany

Trustees of Labour (German: Treuhänder der Arbeit), sometimes referred to as Reich Trustees of Labour, were government-appointed officials of Nazi Germany that were in charge of labour relations between 1933 and 1945 and were responsible for regulating employment contracts and maintaining industrial peace.

== Origin and organization ==
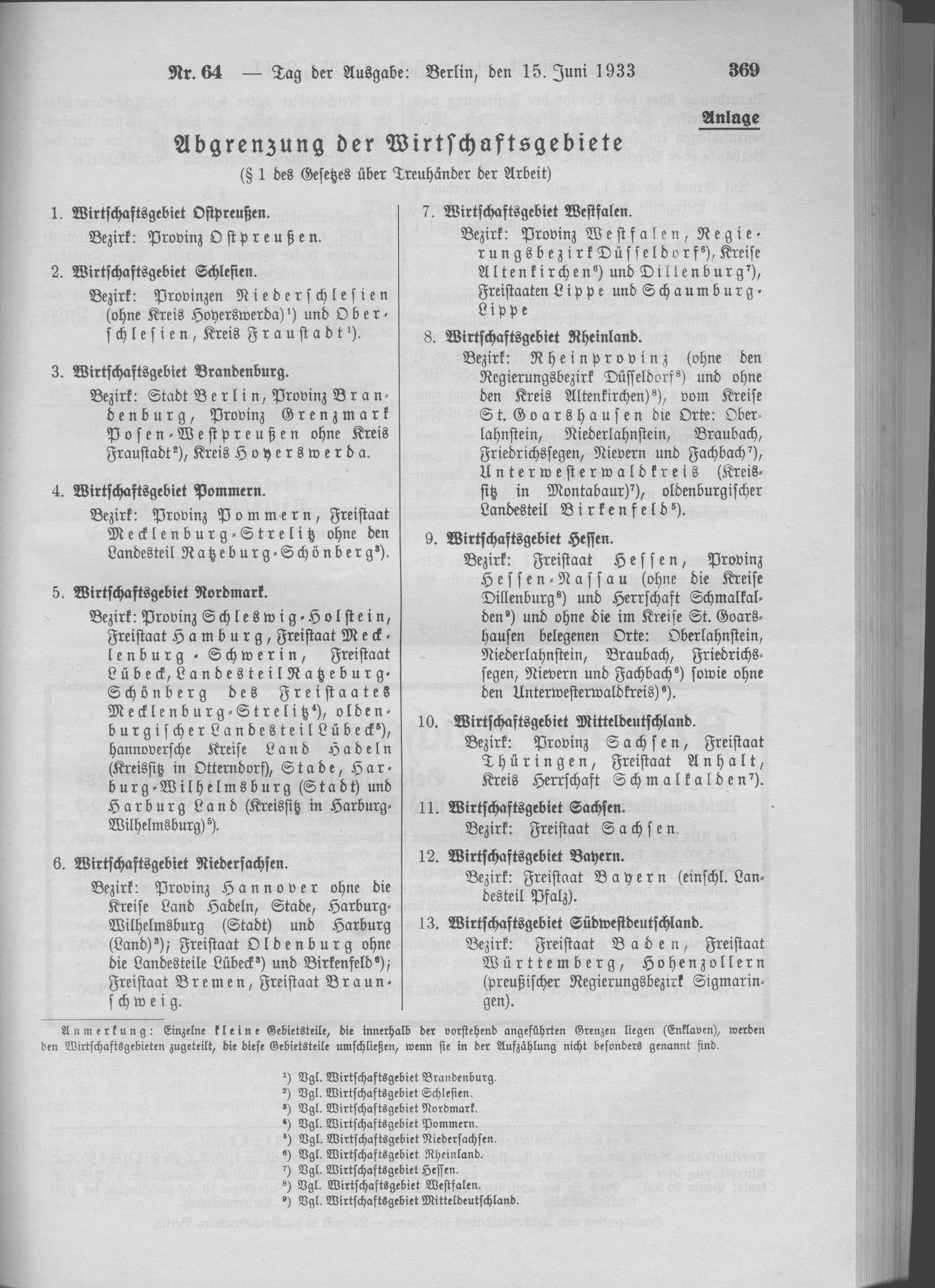
Designation of the first thirteen economic areas in the Reichsgesetzblatt of 15 June 1933

Trustee of Labour Areas in 1944: Lower right insets, middle row, right.

- The Trustees of Labour were established by the Law on the Trustees of Labour (Gesetz über Treuhänder der Arbeit) of 19 May 1933.
- The first trustees were appointed by Reich Chancellor Adolf Hitler on 15 June 1933.
- There initially was one trustee for each of thirteen economic areas (Wirtschaftsgebiete).
- By 1941, due to the geographic expansion of the Reich, there were twenty-two trustees and the position remained in existence through the fall of the Nazi regime in May 1945.
- The trustees were recruited from the state and Party bureaucracy, the private sector or the Association of German Chambers of Industry and Commerce.
- The trustees were Reich officials and were supervised by the Reich Ministry of Labour under Franz Seldte.
- Their term of office was for one year and was renewable every year.

== Responsibilities ==
The chief duties and responsibilities of the Trustees of Labour were set out in the Work Order Act (Arbeitsordnungsgesetz) of 20 January 1934 and included:

- Maintenance of labor peace
- Establishment of wage rates
- Resolution of conflicts regarding working conditions
- Oversight of the establishment of the Councils of Trust (Vertrauensräte)
- Monitoring compliance with operating regulations
- Review and approval of dismissals, particularly mass layoffs

== Effects ==
- The regulation of labour conflicts and the setting of wage levels by the trustees replaced collective bargaining between employers and employees or other systems.
- Since the decisions of the trustees were legally binding, strikes were effectively outlawed.
- Employer associations welcomed the new authority and the persons chosen for it fairly unanimously. The trustees were generally more sympathetic to the interests of the economy than they were to the workers, and generally served the employers' interests.
- Robert Ley, head of the Nazi Party's German Labor Front, summed up the effect of the new system as restoring "absolute leadership to the natural leader of a factory – that is, the employer … Only the employer can decide … Many employers have for years had to call for the 'master in the house'. Now they are once again to be the 'master in the house'".

== Selected Trustees of Labour ==
- Emil Bannemann (1902–1957), Saxony (1936–1937)
- Franz Binz (1896–1965), Rhineland (1939–1945)
- Gustav Böhm (1888–?), Saarpfalz (1935–1939); Upper Austria (1940–1945)
- Wilhelm Börger (1896–1962), Rhineland (1934–1939)
- Franz Claassen (1881–1945), Pomerania (1934–1939)
- Léon Daeschner (1894–?), Brandenburg (1933–1939)
- Johannes Engel (1894–1973), Brandenburg (1933–1934)
- Kurt Frey (1902–1945), Bavaria (1934–1942)
- Rüdiger Graf von der Goltz (1894–1976), Pomerania (1933–1934)
- Karl Hahn (1901–1982), Westphalia (1934–1943)
- Arno Hoppe (1882–1945), Saxony (1933–1934)
- Karl Kimmich (1880–1945), Southwest Germany (1933–1938)
- Josef Klein (1890–1952), Westphalia (1933–1934)
- Carl Lüer (1897–1969), Hesse (1933–1934)
- Richard Markert (1891–1957), Lower Saxony (1933–1935)
- Kurt Melcher (1891–1970), Reich Trustee for public service (1935–1945)
- Heinrich Nietmann (1901–1961), Saarpfalz (1940–1943)
- Alfred Proksch (1891–1981), Ostmark (1938–1940); Vienna/Lower Austria (1940–1943)
- Günther Rachner (1891–1945), Lower Silesia (1943–1945)
- Fritz Schmelter (1904–1964), Hesse (1938–1942)
- Hans Schreiber (1896–1943), East Prussia (1933–1943)
- Walter Schuhmann (1898–1956), Silesia (1936–1941); Lower Silesia (1941–1943)
- Ernst Stiehler (1887–?), Saxony (1934–1936)
- Friedrich Völtzer (1895–1951), Nordmark (1933–1943)
- Karl Heinrich Wiesel (1889–?), Central Germany (1933–1937)

== Sources ==
- Broszat, Martin (1981). The Hitler State: The Foundation and Development of the Internal Structure of the Third Reich. New York: Longman Inc. ISBN 978-0-582-48997-4.
- Mason, Tim (1993): Social Policy in the Third Reich. The Working Class and the 'National Community'. Translated by John Broadwin, Berg Publishers: Oxford, New York, ISBN 978-0-854-96410-9, pp. 104, 135, 176.
- Shirer, William Lawrence (1960), The Rise and Fall of the Third Reich: A History of Nazi Germany, New York City: Simon & Schuster, ASIN B0766DKDLR, LCCN 60006729, OCLC 1286630, OL 5794925M, Wikidata Q138029595
- Zentner, Christian; Bedürftig, Friedemann, eds. (1997) [1991]. The Encyclopedia of the Third Reich. New York: Da Capo Press. ISBN 978-0-306-80793-0.
