= Wilhelm Börger =

Nazi Party politician and SS-Brigadeführer

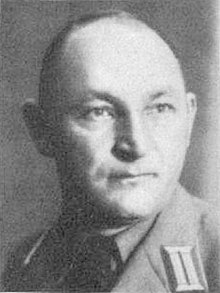

Ministerial Director in the Reich Ministry of Labor
- In office 1 October 1938 – 8 May 1945
- Preceded by: Hermann Rettig
- Succeeded by: Office abolished

Trustee of Labour for the Rhine Province
- In office 13 June 1933 – 1 October 1938
- Preceded by: Office established
- Succeeded by: Office abolished

Additional positions
- 1933–1945: Member of the Prussian State Council
- 1933–1945: Member of the Greater German Reichstag
- 1930–1933: Member of the Reichstag

Personal details
- Born: 14 February 1896 Essen, Rhineland Province, Kingdom of Prussia, German Empire
- Died: 29 June 1962 (aged 66) Heidelberg, Baden-Württemberg, West Germany
- Party: Nazi Party
- Other political affiliations: National Socialist Freedom Party
- Occupation: Locksmith
- Awards: Golden Party Badge

Military service
- Allegiance: German Empire; Nazi Germany
- Branch/service: Imperial German Navy; Schutzstaffel
- Years of service: 1915–1918; 1935–1945
- Rank: SS-Brigadeführer
- Unit: SMS Friedrich der Grosse
- Battles/wars: Battle of Jutland

Wilhelm Heinrich Börger (14 February 1896 – 29 June 1962) was a German Nazi Party functionary and SS-Brigadeführer. He held several administrative positions, including as a Trustee of Labour and a Ministerial Director in the Reich Ministry of Labor. He also sat as a member of the Reichstag and the Prussian State Council. Following the defeat of Nazi Germany in the Second World War, he was interned for three years and released.

== Early life ==
Börger was born in Kray, a borough of Essen. After attending Volksschule, he was apprenticed as a locksmith and then worked as a journeyman at the Dahlbusch colliery in Rotthausen (today, part of Gelsenkirchen). From January 1915 to November 1918, Börger took part in the First World War as a marine artillery mechanic in the Imperial German Navy. He served with the High Seas Fleet aboard the SMS Friedrich der Grosse and participated in the Battle of Jutland. After the end of the war, he returned to the colliery. He subsequently held jobs as a locksmith on the railway, in a paper factory, a chemical factory and an agricultural machine factory. From 1925 to 1930, he was employed by the city of Neuss. Börger began to be politically active around 1920. In 1924, he ran unsuccessfully for the Landtag of Prussia as a member of the National Socialist Freedom Party.

== Nazi Party career ==
On 1 September 1929, Börger joined the Nazi Party (membership number 150,841) and became its Ortsgruppenleiter (Local Group Leader) in Neuss that same year. As an Alter Kampfer, he would later be awarded the Golden Party Badge. Börger was employed by the Party as a public speaker and agitator. In 1930, he advanced to Kreisleiter (County Leader) and, from 1932, he was the Landesobmann-West (West Regional Chairman) of the National Socialist Factory Cell Organization. At the parliamentary election of September 1930, Börger was elected as a deputy of the Reichstag for electoral constituency 22 (Düsseldorf East). Following the Nazi seizure of power, he retained his seat as a member of the Reichstag until the fall of the Nazi regime.

Börger received a teaching position in German Socialism at the University of Cologne in May 1933. He then briefly headed the German Metalworkers Association before being appointed as a Trustee of Labour for the Rhine Province on 13 June 1933 in the Reich Ministry of Labor under Reichsminister Franz Seldte. On 12 October 1933, Prussian Minister president Hermann Göring appointed him to the recently reconstituted Prussian State Council. Börger was appointed by Reich President Paul von Hindenburg to the board of directors of the Reichspost and by President of the Reichsbank Hjalmar Schacht to its board of directors. He was also a member of the Population and Policy Committee of the Reich Ministry of the Interior. On 16 July 1935, he received an honorary professorship and became head of the Institute for German Social Policy at the University of Cologne.

On 1 October 1938, Börger was promoted to Ministerial Director in the Labor Ministry, overseeing Main Department I (General Administration), and also was appointed as a special trustee (Sonderstreuhänder) for mining. A member of the SS since 1935 (SS number 247,066), he was assigned to the SS Race and Settlement Main Office, the organization responsible for safeguarding the "racial purity" of the SS. Börger attained his final promotion to SS-Brigadeführer on 30 January 1939.

Börger was also the editor of published works on National Socialist philosophy, including Angewandte Rassenkunde für jedermann (Applied Racial Studies for Everyone) that was published in 1933. Börger is also credited with coining the term Reichskristallnacht, in a speech at Lüneburg on 24 June 1939, to describe the Jewish pogrom of November 1938.

== Post-war life ==
After Germany's defeat in the Second World War, Börger was detained and taken to an internment camp at Hessisch Lichtenau, then transferred to Nuremberg and was released in 1948. In his de-nazification process, he was initially classified as category III (minor offender) and later reduced to category IV (follower). He returned to Essen and became a sales representative for paints and varnishes. He unsuccessfully sued to obtain his civil service pension and died in Heidelberg in 1962.

== Sources ==
- Das Deutsche Führerlexikon 1934-1935. Berlin: Verlagsanftalt Otto Stollberg G. m. b. H. 1934.
- Information about Wilhelm Börger in the Reichstag database
- Lilla, Joachim (2005). Der Preußische Staatsrat 1921–1933: Ein biographisches Handbuch. Düsseldorf: Droste Verlag. ISBN 978-3-770-05271-4.
- Schiffer Publishing Ltd., ed. (2000). SS Officers List: SS-Standartenführer to SS-Oberstgruppenführer (As of 30 January 1942). Schiffer Military History Publishing. ISBN 0-7643-1061-5.
- Wilhelm Börger curriculum vitae in the Independent Commission of Historians to Research the History of the Reich Ministry of Labor 1933–1945
