= Rüdiger Graf von der Goltz (lawyer) =

German lawyer and Nazi Party politician

Trustee of Labour, Province of Pomerania
- In office 15 June 1933 – April 1934
- Preceded by: Position created
- Succeeded by: Franz Claassen

Deputy Leader of the Overall Organization of the Economy
- In office 13 March 1934 – 4 December 1934
- Preceded by: Position created
- Succeeded by: Position abolished

Additional positions
- 1936–1943: Member of the Reichstag
- 1933–1945: Member of the Prussian State Council
- 1933–1934: President of the Landtag of the Province of Pomerania

Personal details
- Born: 10 July 1894 Charlottenburg, Kingdom of Prussia, German Empire
- Died: 18 April 1976 (age 81) Düsseldorf, North Rhine-Westphalia, West Germany
- Party: Nazi Party
- Parents: Rüdiger von der Goltz (father); Hannah Caroline Helene Marie von Hase (mother)
- Education: University of Geneva; University of Tübingen; Humboldt University of Berlin; University of Greifswald
- Profession: Lawyer

Military service
- Allegiance: German Empire
- Branch/service: Royal Prussian Army
- Years of service: 1912–1915
- Rank: Oberleutnant
- Unit: 1st Foot Guards Regiment
- Battles/wars: World War I
- Awards: Iron Cross, 1st and 2nd class Hanseatic Cross; Wound Badge

Gustav Adolf Karl Joachim Rüdiger Graf von der Goltz (10 July 1894 – 18 April 1976) was a German lawyer and Nazi Party member who, in the years before they came to power, defended many prominent Nazis, including Joseph Goebbels. He was also a member of the Reichstag and the Prussian State Council.

== Early life ==
Goltz was born in Charlottenburg into the German noble family of von der Goltz, the son of a Generalmajor of the Royal Prussian Army, Rüdiger von der Goltz (1865–1946) and his wife, Hannah Caroline Helene Marie von Hase (1873–1941), granddaughter of Karl August von Hase. He attended the Gymnasium in Magdeburg and Berlin. Then he initially trained as a soldier, becoming an officer in the 1st Foot Guards Regiment. He fought in the First World War and left active service in 1915 after sustaining a serious wound that resulted in the amputation of his leg. At the time of his separation, he held the rank of Oberleutnant and had earned the Hanseatic Cross and the Iron Cross, 1st and 2nd class. Goltz then studied law at Geneva, Tübingen and Berlin. In 1919, he received his Doctor of Law degree from the University of Greifswald. He passed his Referendar examination on 16 August 1917, and his Assessor examination on 27 January 1922. From 1922 to 1934, he worked as a lawyer in Stettin.

== Career in Nazi Germany ==
Goltz became known as a defense attorney in several trials of prominent Nazi functionaries accused of fomenting violence, such as the Feme murder trial of Edmund Heines, and also the libel trial of Joseph Goebbels in 1930. On 1 April 1932, Goltz joined the Nazi Party (membership number 1,033,215). Following the Nazi seizure of power, he was made the President of the provincial Landtag of the Province of Pomerania in the spring of 1933, serving until the abolition of all state and provincial parliamentary bodies in January 1934. On 15 June 1933, he was appointed as the first Trustee of Labour for Pomerania, serving until April 1934. On 11 July 1933, Prussian Minister-president Hermann Göring appointed him to the recently reconstituted Prussian State Council. In October, he became a member of the National Debt Auditing Committee. Also in October 1933, Goltz was one of the founding members of Hans Frank's Academy for German Law

Goltz moved to Berlin in 1934, where he continued to work as a lawyer and notary. On 13 March 1934, he was named Stellvertreter des Führers der Gesamtorganisation der Wirtschaft (Deputy Leader of the Overall Organization of the Economy) by Reichsminister of Economy Kurt Schmitt, as part of a plan to reorganize the German economy. On 11 July, Goltz became acting leader of the organization, when he supplanted Philipp Kessler in that post after Kessler differed with Schmitt on major policy points. Speculation at the time was that Goltz was to preside over the liquidation of the organization. This indeed proved to be the case when, after Schmitt was replaced by Hjalmar Schacht, a new plan for organizing the economy was announced and Goltz's position was abolished on 4 December 1934.

Goltz became a member of the criminal law commission at the Reich Ministry of Justice. At the 29 March 1936 parliamentary election, he was elected as a member of the Reichstag from electoral constituency 2, Berlin-West and was reelected in April 1938.

Goltz continued his legal practice and, in March 1938, he represented Generaloberst Werner von Fritsch in his military court of honor during the so-called Blomberg-Fritsch affair. The general had been accused of homosexuality and had been forced to resign as Commander-in-Chief of the German Army. At the trial, Goltz exposed the star prosecution witness as a blackmailer and a perjurer, proved that the homosexual in question actually was another officer named Achim von Frisch and obtained an acquittal for his client. Goltz resigned his seat in the Reichstag in 1943. He was a cousin of Dietrich Bonhoeffer and represented him and Hans von Dohnanyi before the Reichskriegsgericht.

== Post-war life ==
In post-war Germany, he worked as a lawyer at the Higher Regional Court in Düsseldorf, and died in that city in 1976. He was married to Astrid Hjort (* 27. Juni 1896). Their son, Hans von der Goltz, was chairman of the supervisory board of BMW from 1980 to 1993.

== Sources ==
- Das Deutsche Führerlexikon 1934-1935. Berlin: Verlagsanftalt Otto Stollberg G. m. b. H. 1934.
- Lilla, Joachim (2005). Der Preußische Staatsrat 1921–1933: Ein biographisches Handbuch. Düsseldorf: Droste Verlag. ISBN 978-3-770-05271-4.
- Information about Rüdiger Graf von der Goltz (lawyer) in the Reichstag database
- Tyson, Joseph Howard (2010). The Surreal Reich. iUniverse. ISBN 978-1-450-24019-2.
