= Factory leader =

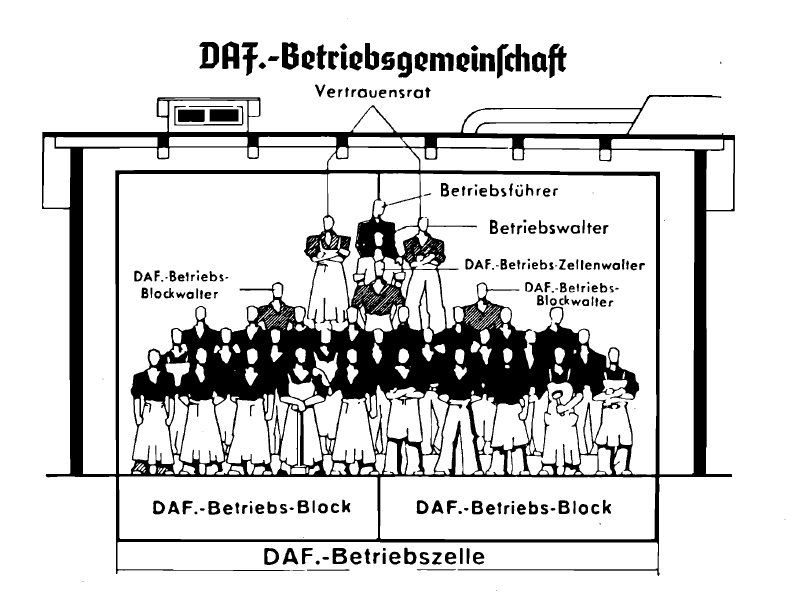
Betriebsführer in a German Labour Front organigram

Factory leader (German: Betriebsführer) was a term introduced by the Work Order Act of 20 January 1934 in Nazi Germany for the owner, entrepreneur or manager of a business or company. Factory leaders and their “followers” (Gefolgschaft) formed the “factory community” (Betriebsgemeinschaft), replicating the national community (Volksgemeinschaft) in accordance with the leader principle (Führerprinzip). The term was also applied to owners and tenants of farms.

== See also ==
- German labour law
- United Kingdom labour law
