= Council of Trust =

Nazi employee association

- Vertrauensräte
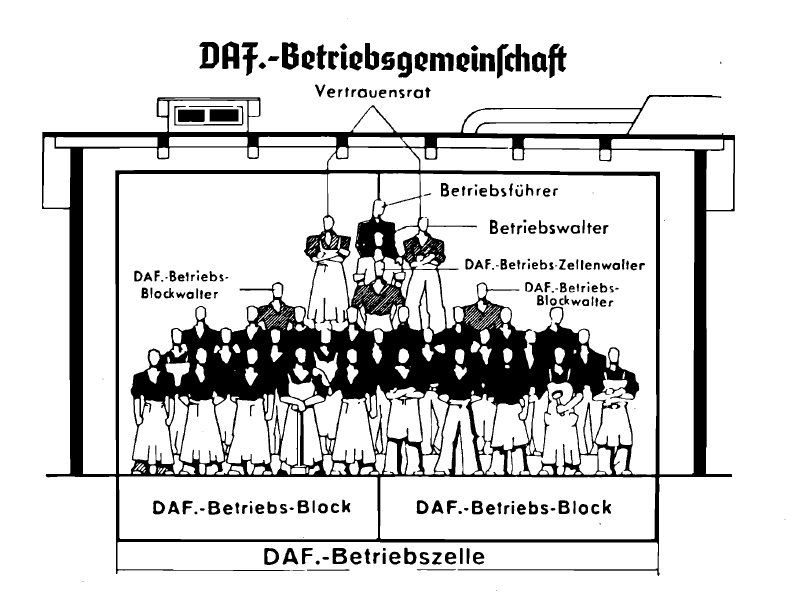
- Council of Trust in German Labour Front organigram
- Purpose: Representation of employees to the “factory leader”
- Location: Germany

Councils of Trust (German: Vertrauensräte) were established in businesses and companies with more than 20 employees in Nazi Germany following the introduction of the Labour organization law of 20 January 1934. They served as the only representation of employees to the “factory leader” (i.e. entrepreneur) (Betriebsführer) in order to increase mutual trust within the factory community. Councillors were elected by secret ballots, but the list of candidates was prepared by the factory leader and the German Labour Front overseer (Betriebsobmann). The councils did not play an active role in industrial relations, except to serve as a platform for discussing working conditions regulated in the “factory code of rules” (Betriebsordnung).

While in 1934 only 2 per cent of businesses and companies were required to establish a council of trust, this affected 46.2 per cent of employees.

== See also ==
- German labour law
- UK labour law
