= Otto-Heinrich Drechsler =

German Nazi politician (1895–1945)

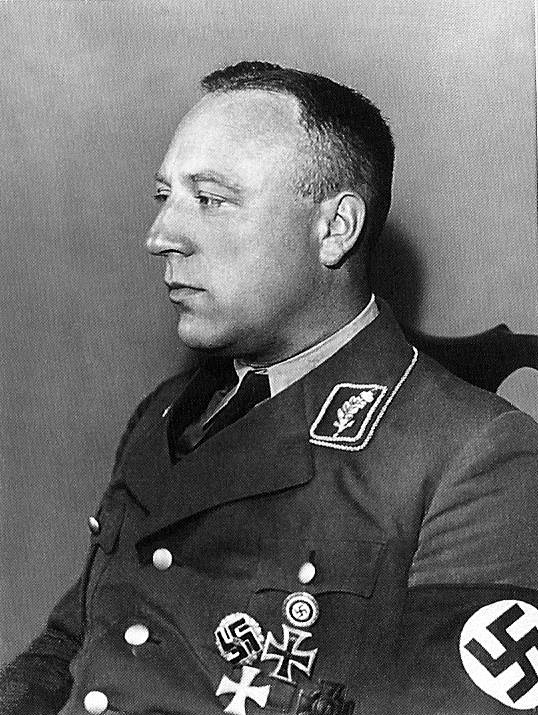
- Drechsler in 1937

General Commissioner of Latvia in Reichskommissariat Ostland
- In office 17 July 1941 – September 1944

Mayor of Lübeck
- In office 31 May 1933 – 8 May 1945
- Preceded by: Paul Löwigt
- Succeeded by: Gerhard Schneider

Deputy Gauleiter of Gau Mecklenburg-Lübeck
- In office 1 August 1932 – 31 May 1933

Personal details
- Born: 1 April 1895 Lübz, Grand Duchy of Mecklenburg-Schwerin, German Empire
- Died: 5 May 1945 (aged 50) Lübeck, Nazi Germany
- Party: Nazi Party
- Education: Dental degree
- Alma mater: University of Rostock
- Profession: Dentist
- Known for: Holocaust perpetrator in Latvia
- Civilian awards: Golden Party Badge

Military service
- Allegiance: German Empire; Weimar Republic
- Branch/service: Imperial German Army; Reichswehr
- Years of service: 1914–1920
- Rank: Leutnant
- Battles/wars: World War I
- Military awards: Iron Cross, 1st class Wound Badge

Otto-Heinrich Drechsler (1 April 1895 – 5 May 1945) was a German Nazi politician who served as the General Commissioner of Generalbezirk Lettland (German for "General District Latvia") for the Nazi Germany's occupation regime Reichskommissariat Ostland during World War II. In this capacity, he played a role in setting up the Riga Ghetto and was implicated in the extermination of Latvian Jews. He committed suicide on 5 May 1945, after being captured by British forces.

== Early life ==
Drechsler became an officer cadet (Fahnenjunker) in the Lübeck infantry regiment of the German Army in 1914. He was severely wounded and lost a leg. He was mustered out of the Reichswehr in 1920. During the Weimar Republic, Drechsler began the study of dentistry at the University of Rostock, and obtained the degree of Doctor of Dental Arts. In this period, he became a member of the Nordic Union.

== Nazi career ==
In 1925, Drechsler joined the Nazi Party and became the Ortsgruppenleiter (local group leader) in Kröpelin. Later, he became the supervisor ("Oberstaffelführer") of a Sturmabteilung (SA) motor squadron. He remained in the SA until the fall of the Nazi regime, advancing to the ranks of SA-Standartenführer in 1934, SA-Oberführer in 1936 and SA-Brigadeführer in 1942.

From 1 August 1932 to 31 May 1933, Drechsler was Deputy Gauleiter for the party district Gau Mecklenburg-Lübeck. On 26 May 1933, Lübeck, together with both Mecklenburg-Schwerin and Mecklenburg-Strelitz, was placed under the authority of a National Governor (Reichsstatthalter) named Friedrich Hildebrandt who was also the Gauleiter in Mecklenburg-Lübeck. On 31 May 1933, he appointed his deputy Drechsler as mayor (Bürgermeister), and Friedrich Völtzer as Senator for Finance and Economy. Additional senators included the Nazis Emil Bannemann (Labor and Welfare), Walther Schröder (Interior), Ulrich Burgstaller (Education and Theater) and Hans Böhmcker (Justice).

Between 1933 and 1937, Drechsler was Mayor of Lübeck and President of the Senate of Lübeck. Following the Greater Hamburg Act on 1 April 1937, he became the first "High Mayor of the Prussian Metropolitan Area of the Hanseatic City of Lübeck" (Oberbürgermeister des preußischen Stadtkreises Hansestadt Lübeck) and entered the Prussian State Council. He held these posts until the fall of the Nazi regime.

== Actions during World War II ==
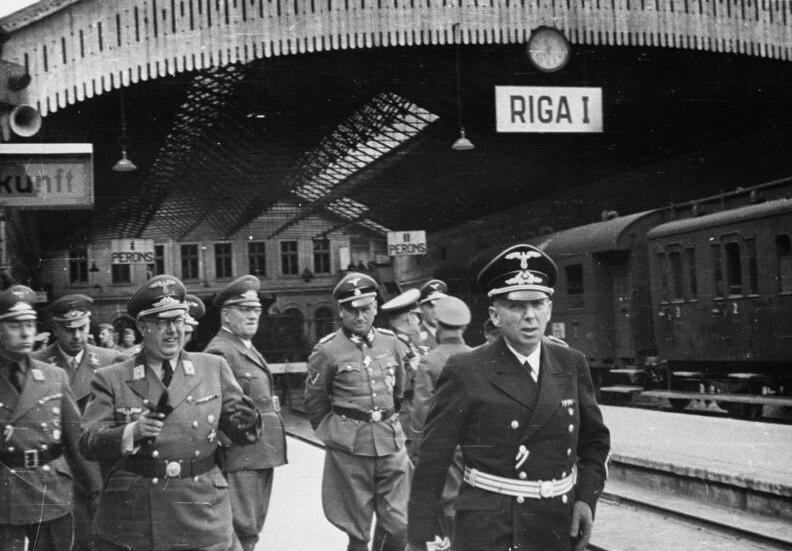
Otto Heinrich Drechsler (extreme left) at Riga railway station, with other Nazi officials, including Hinrich Lohse and Friedrich Jeckeln.

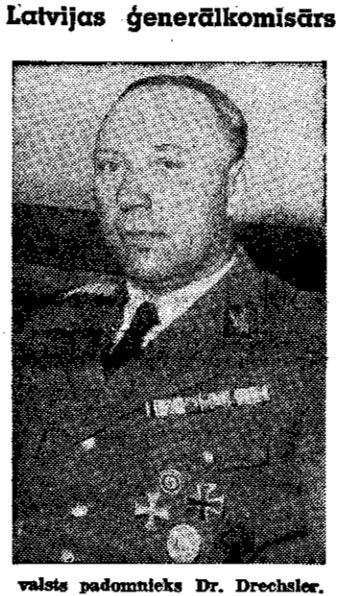
Nazi propaganda photograph of Otto-Heinrich Drechsler, as published in a Latvian newspaper (with original captions).

From 17 July 1941 through 1944, he was Commissioner General (Generalkommissar) for occupied Latvia in the Reichskommissariat Ostland, where he was responsible for the concentration camps in Latvia. As territorial commissioner for Latvia, Drechsler took up quarters in Riga at the beginning of August 1941. At that point in time the military administration had not yet handed over authority to the civil administration. A leading co-worker in the Reich Ministry for the Occupied Eastern Territories (Reichsministerium für die besetzen Ostegebiete or RMfdbO), Otto Bräutigam, noted in his diary of having had a conflict with the military authorities. These disputes, particularly those involving Drechsler's administrative superior, Hinrich Lohse, were never fully resolved. Based on a settlement with RMfdbO, formal assignment of authority over the administration of Latvian territory, including Riga, was effected on 1 September 1941. One historian, Lumans, states that like Lohse, Drechsler was sympathetic to a limited autonomy for Latvians, but unlike Lohse, he worked well with the SS, except for Friedrich Jeckeln, the organizer of massacres of Jews at Babi Yar, Rumbula and others. In addition to his other positions, Drechsler was a member of the board of overseers of an industrial firm called Hochofenwerkes Lübeck AG.

== Involvement in the Holocaust ==
Throughout the time that Drechsler was in Latvia, large numbers of massacres, particularly of Jews, were carried out by the Germans, together with substantial assistance from Latvian collaborators. In addition, the Jews of Latvia were confined to ghettos, which facilitated their enslavement and murder. As early as July 1941, Drechsler was informed, by his subordinate Gebietskommissar Alnor, of the massacres of the Jews in Ventspils. By October 1941, Heinrich Himmler developed a plan (later abandoned) for establishing, near Riga, an extermination camp similar to those later developed for Operation Reinhard, the secret Nazi plan to mass-murder most Polish Jews and Gypsies in the occupied Poland. Jews from Germany, Austria and Czechoslovakia (the so-called "Reich Jews") were to be deported to this camp and then murdered. In late October, Himmler informed Lohse and Drechsler of this plan. Also in October 1941, Drechsler received another report from Alnor, this one concerning the ongoing massacres of the Jews in Liepāja. In autumn 1941 Drechsler was closely involved in setting up the Riga Ghetto as a confinement zone for Jews. Historian Ezergailis states that Drechsler may have been present at the largest massacre, at Rumbula, on 30 November 1941. The great majority of the victims at Rumbula were from the Riga ghetto.

== Capture and suicide ==
Drechsler was captured by the British Army after the occupation of Lübeck. Shortly thereafter, on 5 May 1945, he committed suicide.

== Sources ==
- Ezergailis, Andrew, "Latvia", in The World Reacts to the Holocaust, Wyman, David S., and Rosenzveig, Charles H., Eds., at pages 354–388, Johns Hopkins University Press, Baltimore 1996 ISBN 0-8018-4969-1
- Lumans, Valdis O., Latvia in World War II, New York : Fordham University Press, 2006 ISBN 0-8232-2627-1
- (in German) Antjekathrin Graßmann (Hrsg.): Lübeckische Geschichte, 1989, S. 864 (Anm. zu S. 712). ISBN 3-7950-3203-2
- (in German) Lübecker Volksbote vom 31. Mai 1933
