= Work Order Act =

Nazi law organizing labor under the Führerprinzip

The Work Order Act (German: Arbeitsordnungsgesetz - officially Gesetz zur Ordnung der nationalen Arbeit) of 20 January 1934 was the basis for labour relations in Nazi Germany. It regulated the structure of the enterprises and implemented the leader principle (Führerprinzip) in the economy.

== Content ==
After the trade unions not related to the Nazi Party had been prohibited after May Day 1933, the Nazi controlled government was under pressure to ease working conditions and improve industrial relations. This was first attempted by establishing the position of a Trustee of Labour, who was tasked with fixing minimum wages and overcoming class tensions in businesses and companies. With the Work Order Act, owners and managers became “factory leaders” and responsible not only for the successful operation of the businesses and companies but also for the well-being of their “followers” (i.e. employees), thus the "factory community" replicated the concept of national community within individual business entities. The law also mandated the formation of Councils of Trust in businesses and companies with more than 20 employees, which were headed by the “factory leader” while the other members were elected from a list set up by the “factory leader” and the German Labour Front overseer (Betriebsobmann).

The position of the Trustee of Labour was further expanded, as the law gave them the power to directly intervene in the affairs of individual businesses and companies. A court of honour was set up under each trustee, which was empowered to relieve factory leaders in case of serious misconduct or breaches of trust.

According to the law, the factory leaders possessed absolute authority, and employees had to submit without question. It significantly restricted the ability and chance to complain and eliminated the right of workers to participate in decision-making.

The act was signed by Adolf Hitler (Reich Chancellor), Franz Seldte (Reich Minister of Labour), Dr Kurt Schmitt (Reich Minister of Economics), Dr Franz Gürtner (Reich Minister of Justice), Johann Ludwig Graf Schwerin von Krosigk (Reich Minister of Finance), and Wilhelm Frick (Reich Minister of the Interior).

After the end of World War II the Work Order Act was repealed by Control Council Law (Kontrollratsgesetz) No. 40 of 30 November 1946.

== See also ==
- German labour law

== Sources ==
- Labour organization law (in German)
- Gesetz zur Ordnung der nationalen Arbeit NS-Quellen. Retrieved May 29, 2022 (in German)
- Alfred Hueck / Hans Carl Nipperdey / Rolf Dietz (1934). Gesetz zur Ordnung der nationalen Arbeit. Kommentar. Mit sämtlichen Durchführungsverordnungen, dem Gesetz zur Ordnung der Arbeit in öffentlichen Verwaltungen und Betrieben mit seinen Durchführungsverordnungen und den neuen Arbeitszeitbestimmungen. München: Beck. (in German)
