= Walther Schröder =

SS and Police Leader and SS-Brigadeführer

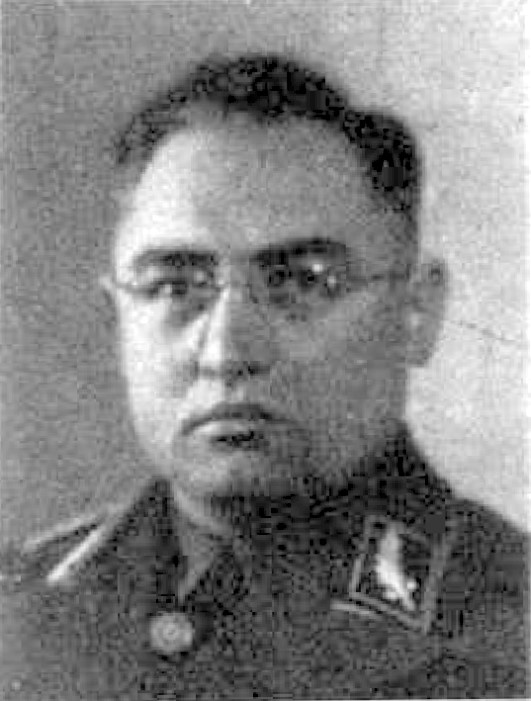
- Born: 26 November 1902; Lübeck, German Empire
- Died: 31 October 1973 (aged 70); Lübeck, West Germany
- Military career
- Allegiance: Nazi Germany
- Branch: Schutzstaffel
- Service years: 1938–1945
- Rank: SS-Brigadeführer and Generalmajor of Police
- Commands: Police President of Lübeck, 1933–1945; SS and Police Leader, "Lettland;" "Estland"
- Conflicts: World War II
- Awards: Iron Cross, 2nd class War Merit Cross, 1st and 2nd class with Swords

Walther Schröder (26 November 1902 – 31 October 1973) was a German Nazi Party politician, SS-Brigadeführer and Police President of Lübeck, who served as an SS and Police Leader in Latvia and Estonia during World War II.

== Early life ==
Schröder was born in Lübeck and went to school until 1919, followed by three years of practical training in mechanical engineering. From 1922 he studied at the technical state school in Hamburg. In the same year he joined the Freikorps Oberland, remaining a member until 1925. In autumn 1924 he passed his state examination. Until 1932 he worked as a designer and engineer at a shipyard in Hamburg and a machine building company in Lübeck.

== Peacetime Party, political and police career ==
Schröder joined the Nazi Party (membership number 6,288) and the SA on 5 May 1925. As an early Party member, he would later be awarded the Golden Party Badge. From September 1927 to 1929 he was SA-Sturmführer of the Gausturm Mecklenburg-Süd. He was also a member of the political organization in the Lübeck Ortsgruppe (Local Group). From 1926 to 1928 he acted as its Propaganda Leader and from June 1928 to 1930 he was Ortsgruppenleiter (Local Group Leader) in Lübeck. In 1930 he left the SA and subsequently worked in the political organization as Bezirksleiter (District Leader) Untergauleiter (Sub-Gau Leader) and Kreisleiter (County Leader) until 1934. He then became the Gau Inspector for Gau Mecklenburg-Lübeck until 1 April 1937.

At the 1929 Lübeck state election, Schröder became one of six Nazi Party members of the Lübeck Bürgerschaft (legislature) and remained a member until it was abolished in 1933. In the July 1932 German parliamentary election, Schröder was elected to the Reichstag for electoral constituency 35, Mecklenburg, serving until the election of March 1936. The Greater Hamburg Act of 1937 removed Lübeck's status as a sovereign German state and made it part of the Prussian Province of Schleswig-Holstein. Schröder then returned to the Reichstag as a deputy for electoral constituency 13, Schleswig-Holstein, at the April 1938 election, and retained this seat until the fall of the Nazi regime.

Shortly after the Nazi seizure of power, Schröder was appointed acting Police President in Lübeck on 6 March 1933. On 31 May he was made permanent Police President and also was appointed to the Lübeck state administration as Senator for Internal Affairs by the Reichsstatthalter (Reich Governor) Friedrich Hildebrandt. On 8 September 1936, Schröder joined the National Socialist Motor Corps (NSKK) as an NSSK-Standartenführer on the staff of the Motor Upper Group North in Hamburg, and on 20 January 1938 he was promoted to NSKK-Oberführer. On 20 April of that year, he left the NSKK and was accepted into the SS (member number 290,797) as an SS-Oberführer, and posted to the Sicherheitsdienst (SD) Main Office headed by Reinhard Heydrich.

== World War II ==
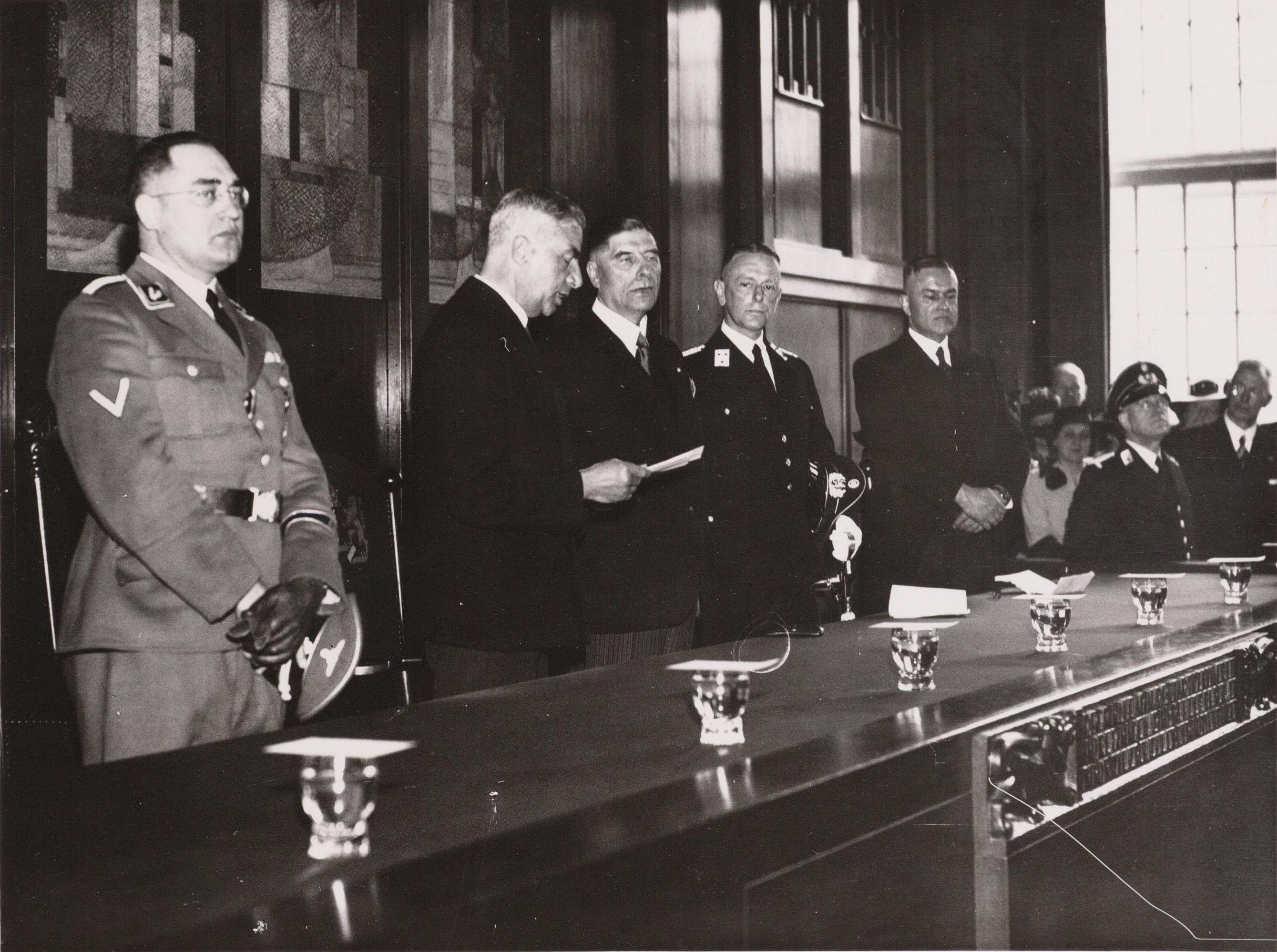
Schröder as chief of German police forces in the Netherlands, 7 May 1941.

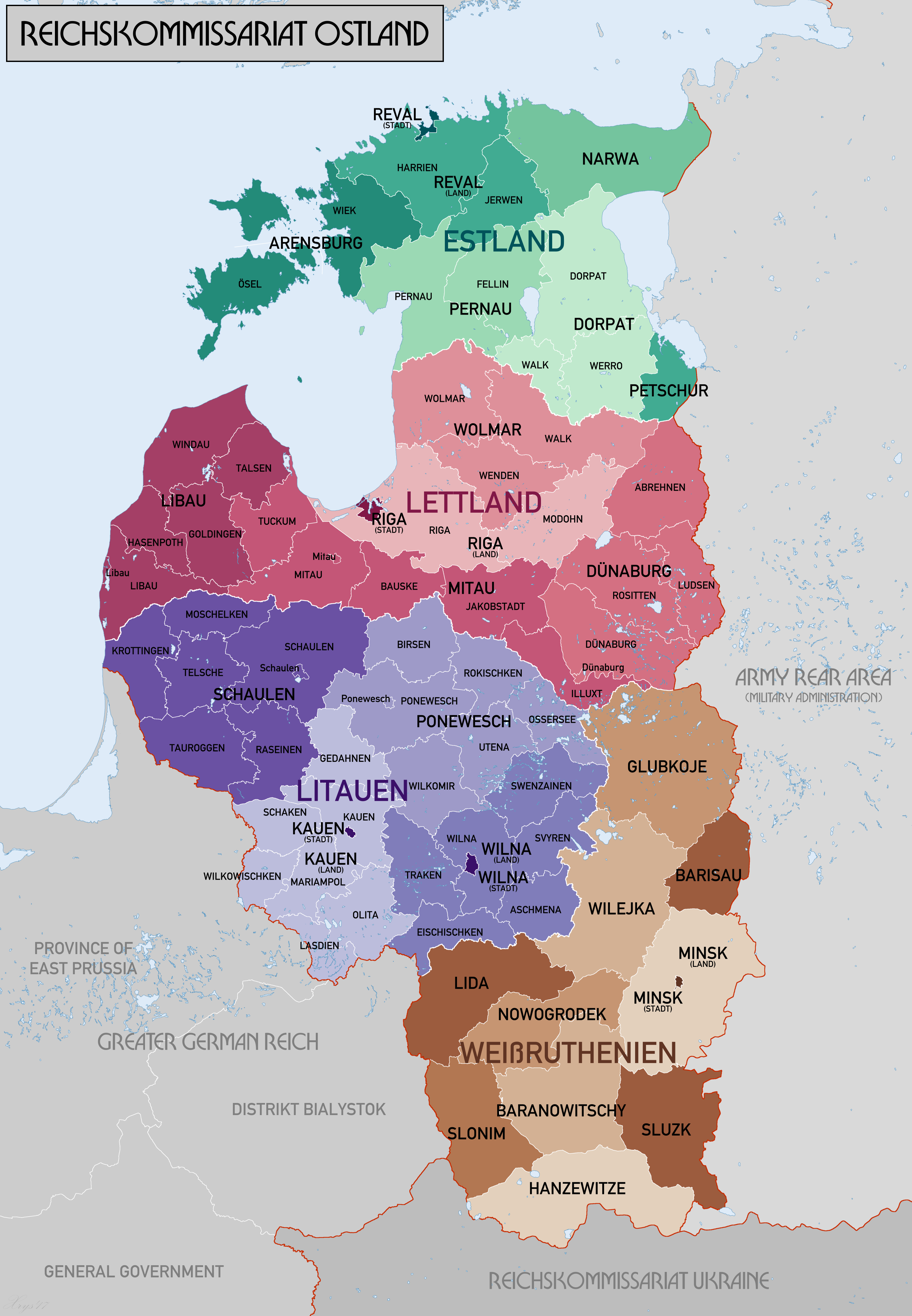
Reichskommissariat Ostland showing Schröder's SSPF jurisdictions of Lettland (1941–1944) and Estland (1944).

Schröder was sent to the Netherlands immediately after the general strike of February 1941, as head of German police forces to help put down the strike and restore order. On 4 August 1941, Schröder was appointed by Reichsführer-SS Heinrich Himmler as SS and Police Leader (SSPF) "Lettland" in the Reichskommissariat Ostland with headquarters in Riga. He was the only holder of this post. He reported to Higher SS and Police Leader (HSSPF), SS-Gruppenführer Hans-Adolf Prützmann, and the Generalkommissar (General Commissioner) of Lettland, Otto-Heinrich Drechsler, who also was the Oberbürgermeister (Lord Mayor) of Lübeck. Schröder controlled the activities of German SS, SD and Ordnungspolizei forces. He also directed the activities of native Latvian law enforcement and security forces, including the Latvian Auxiliary Police, which he controlled as Commander of Order Police. These forces were involved in numerous murders of Jews and other Latvians, including the infamous Liepāja massacres and the Rumbula massacre. It is estimated that over 80,000 Latvians were murdered in the Holocaust.

On 27 September 1941, Schröder was promoted to SS-Brigadefuhrer and Generalmajor of Police. From January 1943, he was involved in the political negotiations for the establishment of the Latvian Legion, a military formation largely composed of Latvian volunteers, which eventually grew to contain the 15th Waffen Grenadier Division of the SS (1st Latvian) and the 19th Waffen Grenadier Division of the SS (2nd Latvian).

On 1 April 1944, Schröder was also appointed the second and last SSPF "Estland," though by autumn Red Army forces were overrunning his jurisdictions. Reval was occupied by Soviet forces on 22 September, Riga fell on 13 October, and on 19 October his two SSPF commands were dissolved and Schröder was transferred back to Lübeck where he still held the post of Police President.

== Post-war period ==
With the British 11th Armored Division approaching Lübeck, Schröder, along with Oberbürgermeister Drescher, advised against further resistance and the city surrendered largely without a fight on 2 May 1945. Schröder was arrested the next day. He underwent denazification proceedings in Bergedorf and was sentenced to two years and nine months in prison. He then lived as a pensioner and died in Lübeck on 31 October 1973.

== See also ==
- Holocaust in Latvia

== Sources ==
- Klee, Ernst (2007). Das Personenlexikon zum Dritten Reich. Wer war was vor und nach 1945. Frankfurt-am-Main: Fischer-Taschenbuch-Verlag. ISBN 978-3-596-16048-8.
- Lumans, Valdis O. (2006). Latvia in World War II. New York City: Fordham University Press. ISBN 978-0-823-22627-6.
- McNab, Chris (2009). The SS: 1923–1945. London: Amber Books. ISBN 978-1-90662-649-5.
- Schiffer Publishing Ltd., ed. (2000). SS Officers List: SS-Standartenführer to SS-Oberstgruppenführer (As of 30 January 1942). Schiffer Military History Publishing. ISBN 0-7643-1061-5.
- Williamson, Gordon (1994). The SS:Hitler's Instrument of Terror. Amber Books. ISBN 978-1-907-44656-6.
- Yerger, Mark C. (1997). Allgemeine-SS: The Commands, Units and Leaders of the General SS. Schiffer Publishing Ltd. ISBN 0-7643-0145-4.
