= Thomas Childers =

American historian (1946–2025)

Thomas Clifford Childers Jr. (December 10, 1946 – November 7, 2025) was an American historian and lecturer. He was hired by the University of Pennsylvania in 1976 and in 2017 became the Sheldon and Lucy Hackney Professor of History Emeritus.

== Life and career ==
Childers was born on December 10, 1946, in Cleveland, Tennessee, where he was also raised. He later attended the University of Tennessee where he received his bachelor's and master's degrees. He gained his Ph.D. in History in 1976 from Harvard University. Much of Childers work focuses on war and society in the twentieth century, particularly World War I and II. His father and uncle both fought in World War II; his uncle was killed in action, and although Childers's father survived, the family still struggled to reunite after his return. This greatly impacted his childhood and influenced his 2009 book about the experiences of American veterans after the war, Soldier from the War Returning: The Greatest Generation's Troubled Homecoming from World War II.

He received several teaching awards including the Ira T. Abrahms Award in 1987 for Distinguish Teaching and Challenging Teaching in the Arts and Sciences, and the Richard S. Dunn Award for Distinguished Teaching in History. While teaching at the University of Pennsylvania Childers took many Visiting Professorships at well-known universities such as the University of Cambridge (at Trinity Hall) and Swarthmore College. He also gave many lectures throughout the world in places like Oxford, Berlin, Munich, and London. Childers's work has been talked about by other historians. Some of those acknowledgements can be found in the book Historiography in the Twentieth Century from Scientific Objectivity to the Postmodern Challenge written by Georg G. Iggers. For example, Iggers states "Thomas Childers concentrates more directly on language." (Iggers 1997)

Childers lectured on four of The Great Courses series. As of 2007, he lived in Media, Pennsylvania. Childers died on November 7, 2025, at the age of 78.

== Publications ==
- Childers, Thomas (1983). The Nazi Voter. University of Pennsylvania Department of History.
- Childers, Thomas (1986). "The Formation of the Nazi Constituency, 1919-1933". University of Pennsylvania Department of History.
- Childers, Thomas (1993). "Reevaluating the Third Reich (Europe Past and Present)". University of Pennsylvania Department of History.
- Childers, Thomas (1996). Wings of Morning: The Story of the Last American Bomber Shot Down Over Germany in World War II. University of Pennsylvania Department of History.
- Europe and Western Civilization in the Modern Age [sound recording] (2000)
- History of Hitler's Empire [sound recording]
- World War II: A Military and Social History [sound recording]
- 36 Revolutionary Figures in History: Hitler's Foreign Policy [sound recording]
- Childers, Thomas (2003). In the Shadows of War: An American Pilot's Odyssey through Occupied France and the Camps of Nazi Germany. University of Pennsylvania Department of History.
- Childers, Thomas (May 2009). "Soldier from the War Returning: The Greatest Generation's Troubled Homecoming from World War II". University of Pennsylvania Department of History.
- The Third Reich: A History of Nazi Germany (October, 2017)

== Sources ==
- Iggers, Georg G. Historiography in the Twentieth Century from Scientific Objectivity to the Postmodern Challenge. Hanover: University Press of New England, 1997.
- The Century: Ultimate Power. Directed by Kenneth Levis. Performed by Thomas Childers and Peter Jenning. 1999.
- "Welcome to the University of Pennsylvania". University of Pennsylvania.
- Arizona State Libraries http://lib.asu.edu/
- Childers, Thomas, interview by CB. Professional Life Story (May 1, 2009).
