= Reinhold Muchow =

Nazi Party official (1905–1933)

Organisation Leader German Labour Front
- In office 10 May 1933 – 12 September 1933
- Preceded by: Position created

National Organiser National Socialist Factory Cell Organization
- In office 15 January 1931 – 10 May 1933
- Preceded by: Position created

Gau Organisation Leader Gau Berlin
- In office 1 July 1928 – 15 January 1931

Personal details
- Born: 21 December 1905 Neukölln, Kingdom of Prussia, German Empire
- Died: 12 September 1933 (aged 27) Bacharach am Rhein, Bavaria, Nazi Germany
- Party: Nazi Party
- Other political affiliations: German National People's Party; German Social Party

Military service
- Allegiance: Weimar Republic
- Branch/service: Freikorps Oberland
- Years of service: 1920

Reinhold Muchow (21 December 1905 – 12 September 1933) was a Nazi Party organiser and official. A protégé of Berlin Gauleiter Joseph Goebbels, he was held in high regard in the early years of the movement for his organisational skills and especially for the model Party cell organisation that he developed. He was associated with the economic left wing of the Party and played leading roles in the National Socialist Factory Cell Organization and the German Labour Front. He died at age 27 and conflicting accounts of the cause of his death were reported.

== Early life ==
Muchow was born in the working class city of Neukölln (today, a district of Berlin), the son of a typesetter. He attended the local Volksschule and a technical vocational school. While still a teenager in 1920, he joined the Freikorps Oberland and the conservative German National People's Party. He later gravitated to the more far-right and antisemitic German Social Party led by Richard Kunze and, on 3 December 1925, he joined the Nazi Party of Adolf Hitler (membership number 24,006). As an early member, he was considered an Alter Kämpfer (old fighter).

== Party organisation leader in Berlin ==
Muchow soon became deputy to Walter Schuhmann, the leader of Berlin's District 1 (Neukölln), who also made him head of propaganda and organisation. He began to reorganise the Party based on street cells (Strassenzellen). He studied the cell organisation of the Communist Party when developing his organisational reforms. In fact, Muchow's structure was strongly influenced by the Communist cell structure. He developed what came to be known as the Muchow Plan, a cell-based structure for Nazi Party organisation on the local level. It provided for a series of vertical components within an urban locale, ranging from street cells of about five members up through a section of ten to twenty city blocks. This made for a smooth integration of new members by fostering personal contacts between lower echelon leaders and the rank and file, which proved important for the growth of the party.

Joseph Goebbels, the Gauleiter of Berlin-Brandenburg, recognized the organisational talent of the young activist and appointed Muchow as the organisational leader for the entire city of Greater Berlin on 1 July 1928. Muchow's "Neukölln model" thus became the blueprint for the reorganisation of the entire Berlin party structure. By early 1930, the city had over nine hundred street cells organized into forty sections. Over twelve hundred local functionaries could be mobilized to carry out campaign tasks such as distributing block newspapers produced by the sections. In 1930, an intense conflict between the Sturmabteilung (SA) paramilitary units and the Berlin Party organisation erupted into the Stennes revolt. Goebbels reported that on 29 August 1930, members of the Berlin SA-Standarte IV were intent on demolishing the Gau Berlin headquarters and beating Muchow and Franz Wilke. Though Goebbels was able to defuse the situation temporarily, the next day the SA did attack and destroy the Gau headquarters, injuring two SS guards but there is no indication that Muchow was injured.

== Labour organizer ==
Muchow was associated with the Strasser brothers on the left wing of the party, and he expressed open sympathy with the Communists. As an anti-capitalist, Muchow devoted himself entirely to winning over the working class to the Nazi movement. In his early days in Berlin, Muchow had set up the Central Union of the Unemployed in an attempt to attract new members to the Party through propaganda aimed at the working class in proletarian north Berlin. However, this initiative was closed down by Goebbels on orders from the central leadership, which at the time was more focused on attracting the middle class. Pressure from below in the form of spontaneous organisation of white-collar workers and technicians in several Berlin plants spurred Goebbels to grant official recognition to these worker groups at the congress of the Berlin Party in July 1928, establishing the Gau Secretariat for Worker Affairs (Sekretariat fur Arbeiterangelegenheiten) on 30 July. Muchow was entrusted with leadership of the new organisation. For a long period, the national leadership resisted accepting the new unit, but finally adopted the Berlin model to retain the support of industrial workers. On 15 January 1931, the Party's Reichsleitung (national leadership) in Munich established the Reich Industrial Cell Department (Reichsbetriebszellenabteilung, RBA), which reported to Reich Organisation Leader Gregor Strasser. Muchow was selected as its national organiser and moved to Munich. The RBA was placed under the direction of Muchow's former chief Walter Schuhmann, and was renamed the National Socialist Factory Cell Organization (NSBO) on 8 March 1931. It was charged with conducting propaganda among the membership of trade unions and was the first Nazi group explicitly organized for the purpose of industrial agitation. Each Gau was to have one NSBO staff official and their goal was to set up at least one cell in every factory. Muchow founded the NSBO journal Arbeitertum (Workerdom), which began publication on 1 March 1931.

Following the Nazi seizure of power, Muchow sat on the central committee for the preparation of the 1 April 1933 Nazi boycott of Jewish businesses and, together with Schuhmann and Robert Ley, also was involved in planning the violent overthrow of the mainstream German trade unions on 2 May 1933. The German Labour Front (DAF) headed by Ley, was established to take the place of the independent trade unions on 10 May. Muchow was named its organisational leader and developed its fourteen corporatist occupational divisions based on branches of work. His publication Arbeitertum became the official journal of the DAF.

== Death ==
On 12 September 1933, Muchow died of a gunshot wound in Bacharach am Rhein. There are conflicting accounts of the sequence of events. In one version that appeared in the German press, Muchow allegedly fell victim to an accidentally discharged gunshot by his friend, SA-Sturmbannführer Willi Mähling, in a restaurant. The distraught Mähling then allegedly shot himself in the head and died instantly, while Muchow reportedly expired at a hospital shortly after admission. Another version, contained in a contemporaneous report from George S. Messersmith – the American consul general in Berlin – and based on inquiries made by numerous foreign correspondents, states that Murchow was intentionally shot by his friend in a tavern during an altercation after they had both been drinking heavily. Other companions in their party, enraged as Murchow's death, then allegedly killed Mähling with two gunshots to his head. Yet another alternate narrative claimed that Muchow died in an automobile accident. That may have been put forward in an attempt by the Party to cover-up an embarrassing scandal.

Both Muchow and Mähling were given a state funeral in Berlin on 16 September 1933. Muchow was buried in the Luisenstädtischer Friedhof in the Kreuzberg section of Berlin but the gravesite has not survived. In Eilenburg, a new settlement built in 1935 was named "Muchow Settlement" in his honor. It bore this name until 1946, when the name was changed to "Karl Liebknecht Settlement".

== Sources ==
- Barbian, Jan-Pieter (2004). The Politics of Literature in Nazi Germany: Books in the Media Dictatorship. New York: Bloomsbury Publishing. ISBN 978-1-441-17923-4.
- Kershaw, Ian (1998). Hitler: 1889–1936 (2nd ed.). Stuttgart: Deutsche Verlags-Anstalt DVA. ISBN 978-3-763-24881-0.
- Longerich, Peter (2015). Goebbels: A Biography. Vintage. ISBN 978-0-099-52369-7.
- Mühlberger, Detlef (2004). Hitler's Voice: The Völkischer Beobachter, 1920-1933. Vol. 1: Organisation & Development of the Nazi Party. Peter Lang AG, Internationaler Verlag der Wissenschaften. ISBN 978-3-906-76972-1.
- Orlow, Dietrich (1969). The History of the Nazi Party: 1919–1933. University of Pittsburgh Press. ISBN 0-8229-3183-4.
- Schoenbaum, David (1967). Hitler's Social Revolution: Class and Status in Nazi Germany 1933-1939. Garden City, N.Y.: Anchor Books Doubleday & Company, Inc.
- Snyder, Louis L. (1976). Encyclopedia of the Third Reich. McGraw Hill Inc. ISBN 978-1-569-24917-8.
- Zentner, Christian; Bedürftig, Friedemann, eds. (1997) [1991]. The Encyclopedia of the Third Reich. New York: Da Capo Press. ISBN 978-0-306-80793-0.
