= Walter Schuhmann =

Nazi Party official (1898–1956)

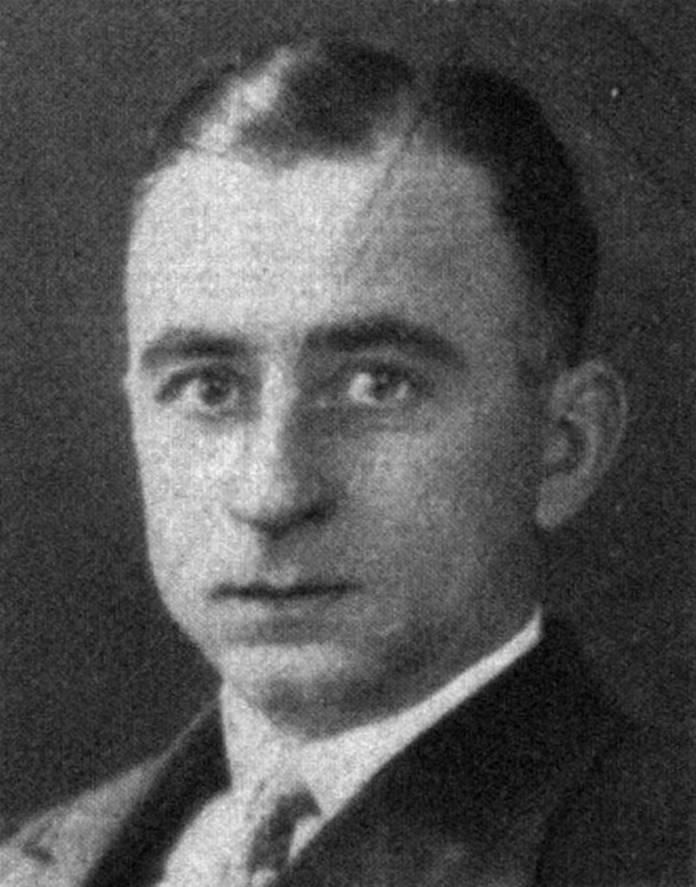
- Schuhmann c. 1930

Leader National Socialist Factory Cell Organization
- In office 15 January 1931 – January 1935
- Preceded by: Position created

Trustee of Labour Silesia (From January 1941, Lower Silesia)
- In office 1 March 1936 – 1943

Additional positions
- 1933–1945: Reichstag Deputy
- 1930–1933: Reichstag Deputy
- 1929–1933: Berlin City Councilor

Personal details
- Born: 3 April 1898 Berlin, Kingdom of Prussia, German Empire
- Died: 2 December 1956 (aged 58) Berlin, West Germany
- Party: Nazi Party
- Occupation: Machinist

Military service
- Allegiance: German Empire
- Branch/service: Imperial German Army
- Years of service: 1917–1919
- Battles/wars: World War I

Walter Schuhmann (3 April 1898 – 2 December 1956) was a Nazi Party official who became head of the National Socialist Factory Cell Organization (NSBO). He also was a member of the SA and the SS.

== Early life ==
Schuhmann, the son of a toolmaker, first attended Volksschule and advanced training school in Berlin before working in agriculture. He completed his training at the Heimland agricultural cooperative in Brandenburg founded by Theodor Fritsch. He enlisted in the Imperial German Army in 1917 and fought in the First World War on both the eastern front and the western front, where he was wounded in 1917. Returning to civilian life in 1919, he worked in Berlin until 1929 as a machinist of high antennas and lightning rods. From 1920 to 1925 he was a member of the Freikorps Oberland.

Schuhmann joined the Nazi Party (membership number 19,874) and its paramilitary organization, the Sturmabteilung (SA), in October 1925. As an early member of the Party (Alter Kämpfer) he would later be awarded the Golden Party Badge. He became the section leader in Berlin's borough of Neukölln from September 1926 to November 1929. From November 1929 to December 1930 he was Organisationsleiter (Organizational Leader) in Gau Berlin under Gauleiter Joseph Goebbels.

== Head of the National Socialist Factory Cell Organization ==
Schuhmann was involved in the founding of the National Socialist Factory Cell Organization (NSBO) in Berlin and, on 15 January 1931, became head of the NSBO Section (upgraded to Office in December 1932) in the Nazi Party Reichsleitung (National Leadership) in Munich. Also in 1931, he became a member of the Party's Reich Economic Council.

After the January 1933 Nazi seizure of power, Schuhmann was named Reichsobmann (Reich Chairman) of the NSBO. Together with Robert Ley, Schuhmann was instrumental in the Gleichschaltung (coordination) process of bringing all independent trade unions into line with Nazi policy, and he was involved in the planning for the violent take over of the trade unions on 2 May 1933. After Ley's German Labour Front (DAF) was established on 10 May 1933, Schuhmann became the leader of the Gesamtverbandes der deutschen Arbeiter (General Association of German Workers) under its auspices. On 13 July 1933, Prussian Minister President Hermann Göring appointed him to the recently reconstituted Prussian State Council. In October, he became a founding member of Hans Frank's Academy for German Law.

However, once the Nazis were firmly in control of the government and the economy, they had little use for a workers' interest group. Ley, seeking to build up the new DAF into his own power base, quickly worked to reduce the status of the NSBO. The NSBO, like the SA, was on the Party's social-revolutionary wing and gradually lost influence after the Röhm purge of 30 June 1934. In the following weeks, several prominent NSBO leaders were purged from the organization. It was deprived of the power to levy dues and was absorbed into the DAF in January 1935.

== Later positions and elective offices ==
On 1 March 1936 Schuhmann was named the Reich Trustee of Labour for the Province of Silesia (in January 1941, Province of Lower Silesia) in the Reich Ministry of Labor. In this post, he had responsibility for setting wage rates, enforcing factory regulations and overseeing dismissals and layoffs. In November 1939, Schuhmann transferred from the SA to the Allgemeine SS (SS number 347,116) and was granted the rank of SS-Standartenführer. In 1942 he was named President of the Lower Silesian Provincial Labor Office. From 1943 he was employed as Ministerial Director under Fritz Sauckel, the General Plenipotentiary for Labor Deployment, and held the Party rank of Hauptstellenleiter.

Apart from his Party and governmental offices, Schuhmann also pursued a career in elective politics. From 1929 to 1933, he was a Berlin City Councilor and served as Second Chairman of the Nazi faction on the council. In 1930, he was elected to the Reichstag from Wahlkreis (electoral constituency) 3 (Potsdam II). Switching to Wahlkreis 2 (Berlin) in 1932, he was reelected in each subsequent election and continued to serve in the Reichstag until the fall of the Nazi regime in May 1945.

No details are documented concerning Schuhmann's post-war life, and he died in Berlin in December 1956.

== Sources ==
- Broszat, Martin (1981). The Hitler State: The Foundation and Development of the Internal Structure of the Third Reich. New York: Longman Inc. ISBN 978-0-582-48997-4.
- Klee, Ernst (2007). Das Personenlexikon zum Dritten Reich. Wer war was vor und nach 1945. Frankfurt-am-Main: Fischer-Taschenbuch-Verlag. ISBN 978-3-596-16048-8.
- Lilla, Joachim (2005). Der Preußische Staatsrat 1921–1933: Ein biographisches Handbuch. Düsseldorf: Droste Verlag. ISBN 978-3-770-05271-4.
- Orlow, Dietrich (1973). The History of the Nazi Party: 1933–1945. University of Pittsburgh Press. ISBN 0-822-9-3253-9.
- Schiffer Publishing Ltd., ed. (2000). SS Officers List: SS-Standartenführer to SS-Oberstgruppenführer (As of 30 January 1942). Schiffer Military History Publishing. ISBN 0-7643-1061-5.
- Zentner, Christian; Bedürftig, Friedemann, eds. (1997) [1991]. The Encyclopedia of the Third Reich. New York: Da Capo Press. ISBN 978-0-306-80793-0.
