= Reichsberufswettkampf =

Vocational competition in Nazi Germany

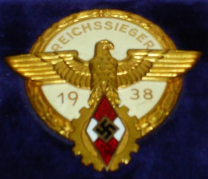
Reichsberufswettkampf victor's badge, 1938.

The Reichsberufswettkampf (translated as "Reich vocational contest" or "national trade competition") was an annual vocational competition held in Nazi Germany as part of the Gleichschaltung of German society.

The competition was organised by the German Labour Front with the aid of the Hitler Youth and the National Socialist German Students' League. It was held at the local, Gau and national level, and was subdivided into numerous vocational and academic branches. Competitors were tested in the theory and practice of their profession, as well as in their adherence to Nazi ideology. Women were also tested in housekeeping. The winners were presented to Labour Front head Robert Ley and to Hitler in person, and could expect substantial professional advancement.

The number of competitors grew from some 500,000 in 1934 at the first competition to 3,500,000 in 1939. Students were admitted in 1935 and adults in 1938. The competition was suspended at the outbreak of World War II in 1939, with the exception of a wartime competition (Kriegsreichsberufswettkampf) in 1944.
