= MV Robert Ley =

Cruise ship

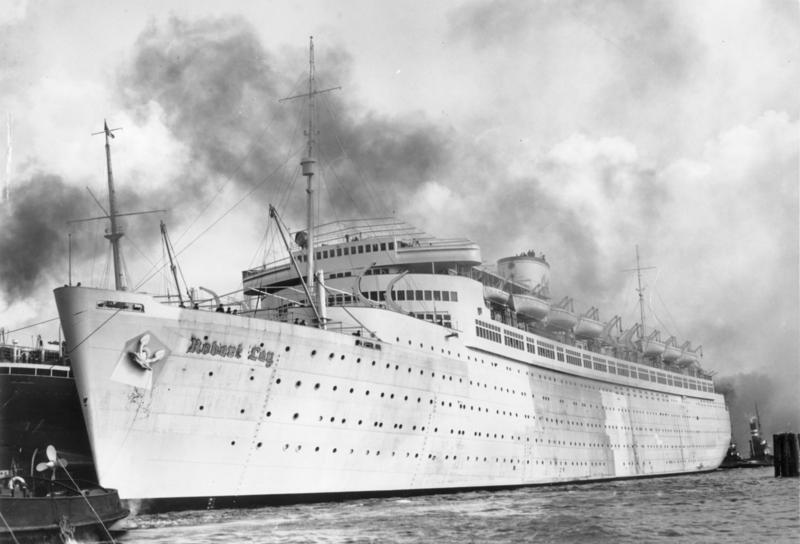
- KdF ship Robert Ley before its maiden voyage, March 1939

History

Germany
- Name: Robert Ley
- Namesake: Robert Ley
- Owner: Deutsche Arbeitsfront
- Operator: Hamburg-Amerikanische Packetfahrt-Actien-Gesellschaft (HAPAG)
- Port of registry: Hamburg, Germany
- Builder: Howaldtswerke Hamburg
- Yard number: 754
- Laid down: 1 May 1936
- Launched: 29 March 1938
- Acquired: 24 March 1939
- Fate: Requisitioned into the Kriegsmarine on 25 August 1939

Nazi Germany
- Name: Robert Ley / Lazarettschiff B
- Operator: Kriegsmarine (German navy)
- Acquired: 25 August 1939
- Out of service: March 1945
- Fate: Bombed at Hamburg 9 March 1945
- Notes: Used as floating barracks and as a hospital ship

General characteristics
- Class & type: Cruise ship
- Tonnage: 27,288 GRT
- Length: 203.8 m (668 ft 8 in)
- Beam: 24.1 m (79 ft 1 in)
- Height: 20.7 m (67 ft 11 in)
- Draught: 7.56 m (24 ft 10 in)
- Installed power: 8,800 hp (6,600 kW)
- Propulsion: Six MAN 2-stroke 6-cylinder diesels driving electric generators; 2 propellers
- Speed: 15.5 kn (28.7 km/h; 17.8 mph)
- Capacity: 1,510 passengers
- Crew: 435

MV Robert Ley was a cruise ship of the Nazi Party leisure organization Kraft durch Freude (Strength Through Joy). She was considered the flagship of the KdF fleet.

== History ==
=== Construction and equipment ===
The ship, which was named after the Nazi politician Robert Ley, was designed exclusively for cruises. The keel was laid on behalf of the Nazi organisation Deutsche Arbeitsfront (German Labour Front) at Howaldtswerke Hamburg. Robert Ley was owned by the DAF and was managed, crewed and maintained by the Hamburg-Amerikanische Packetfahrt-Actien-Gesellschaft (HAPAG).

The interior design was commissioned by architect Woldemar Brinkmann. Accommodation on board the ship was single-class in 463 two- and four-bed cabins. Additionally, two 30-bed dormitories were for members of Nazi youth organizations. There was a single luxury suite referred to as the Apartment for Adolf Hitler, though he never used it. Unusually, the crew accommodation was built to the same standard as that for the passengers.

The launch took place on 29 March 1938 in the presence of Adolf Hitler. The commissioning took place on 24 March 1939.

The ship was designed for about 1750 passengers in addition to the crew members.

The decks of Robert Ley consisted of:

- Command bridge (with cabins for captain and officers)
- Sundeck (with library)
- Boat deck (with cabins and small lounges)
- Promenade deck (with the main company rooms)
- A-deck (with cabins, dining rooms with 860 seats and utility rooms)
- B deck (with cabins, laundry and hairdresser)
- C-deck (with cabins, bakery and butchery) (bulkhead deck)
- D-deck (with cabins, hospital, dining room for crew and workshop)
- E-deck (with cabins)
- F-deck (with swimming pool, luggage room, supplies and provisions, laundry, machine and auxiliary machinery room)

=== Use until 1945 ===
Until the beginning of World War II on 1 September 1939, Robert Ley was used as a cruise ship for the Strength Through Joy (Kraft durch Freude) organisation.

In May 1939, she sailed together with the KdF ships Wilhelm Gustloff, Stuttgart, Der Deutsche and Sierra Cordoba and the ship Oceana to Vigo, Spain, where the fleet arrived on 24 May and unloaded medical and other materials for the nationalist government. On 26 May, the troops of the Condor Legion came on board, 1416 men on the Robert Ley, returning to Hamburg on 30 May.

Shortly before the beginning of the Second World War, Robert Ley was taken over on 25 August 1939 as a hospital ship by the Kriegsmarine and converted accordingly in Hamburg. Due to a lack of demand, she was decommissioned on 22 November 1939 as a hospital ship and instead, after further conversion was used as living quarters of the 1st Submarine Training Division in Neustadt, assigned from July 1941 at Pillau. From the end of July 1944 she was used as a casualty transport ship in the Baltic Sea, then from September 1944 again as an accommodation ship, this time for the 1st Submarine Training Division in Hamburg-Finkenwerder. After the breakthrough of the Red Army on the Eastern Front, Robert Ley was used in Operation Hannibal for the evacuation of civilians and wounded from East Prussia. She left Pillau on 25 January 1945.

=== Fate ===
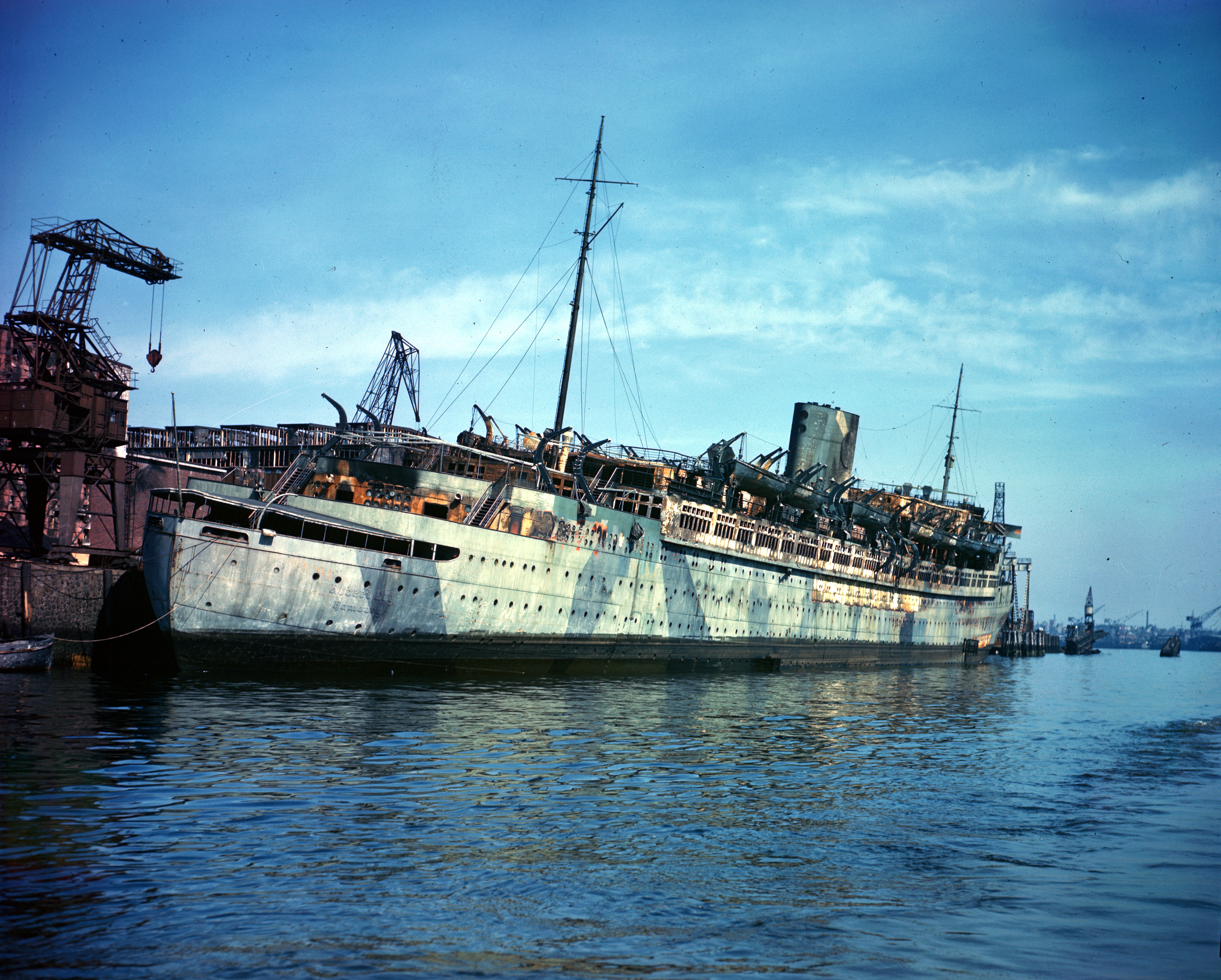
Burned out wreck of Robert Ley in 1945

On 9 March 1945, Robert Ley was in the Port of Hamburg during an air raid on the city by the Royal Air Force. The ship received several bomb hits and burned out completely. The still-floating wreck was still in the harbour basin until June 1947, when it was towed to the UK and scrapped by ship breakers Thos. W. Ward at Inverkeithing.
