= Arbeitsfront der Volksdeutschen in der Slowakei =

Arbeitsfront der Volksdeutschen in der Slowakei ('Labour Front of the Volksdeutsche in Slovakia', abbreviated A.d.V.) was an organization of ethnic German workers in World War II Slovakia. A.d.V. was modelled after the German Labour Front (D.A.F.) in Nazi Germany. A.d.V. was formed on 26 November 1940, replacing the previous German Trade Unions in Slovakia. A.d.V. leaders were trained at the D.A.F. training centre in Schwechat.

As of 1943 A.d.V. claimed to have over 33,000 members.
