= Muchow Plan =

The Muchow Plan was an organisational structure for Nazi Party membership developed by Reinhold Muchow when he was leader of the Greater Berlin Gau 1 in 1925.

Under the Muchow Plan, the Party's local organisation consisted of a series of subdivisions, in a manner influenced by the cell structure of the Communist Party. The smallest subdivision was a cell, led by a Zellenobleute; this might consist of only a few members. Cells were organised into a Sektion, and these were collected into an Ortsgruppe.

The plan served to increase the growth of the Party and facilitate the integration of new members. After 1928, the Plan become the standard for party structure across Germany. The central organisation was led by Muchow in Munich.
