= Strength Through Joy =

Nazi leisure organization (1933–1945)

- Kraft durch Freude
- Formation: November 27, 1933
- Dissolved: May 8, 1945
- Type: Party organization
- Purpose: Organizing subsidized leisure activities and holidays Creating Volksgemeinschaft; Promoting Nazism
- Headquarters: Berlin
- Location: Nazi Germany
- Leader: Robert Ley
- Parent organization: German Labour Front
- Staff: 7,000 (1939)
- Volunteers: 135,000 (1939)

NS Gemeinschaft Kraft durch Freude (KdF; English: Strength Through Joy) was a German NSDAP-operated leisure organization in Nazi Germany. It was part of the German Labour Front (German: Deutsche Arbeitsfront), the national labour organization at that time. Strength Through Joy was set up in November 1933.

KdF was composed of several departments with their own specific goals, with each department organizing different leisure activities for German workers. It organized activities such as sporting events on factory floors, art exhibitions, discounted concerts and, most famously and popularly, subsidized holidays and cruise trips (both in Germany and abroad). One of its largest departments, although sometimes considered a separate organization altogether, was Beauty of Labour, which concerned itself with physical and sanitary improvements of the workplace. KdF was responsible for the improvement of several factories and sports facilities throughout its operations in the 1930s.

KdF was supposed to bridge the class divide by making middle-class leisure activities available to the masses. It also sought to bolster the German tourist industry, something it did successfully up until the outbreak of World War II. Official statistics showed that in 1934, 2.3 million people took KdF holidays. By 1938, this figure rose to 10.3 million. By 1939, it became the world's largest tourism operator. With the outbreak of war in 1939, most of the organization's programs were suspended and several projects, such as the Prora holiday resort, were never completed.

As a tool to promote the advantages of Nazism to the German people and international public, through its structure of organized events and promotion of propaganda, it was also intended to prevent dissident and anti-state behavior. It was used to ease the process of the rearmament of Germany as well.

== Organization ==
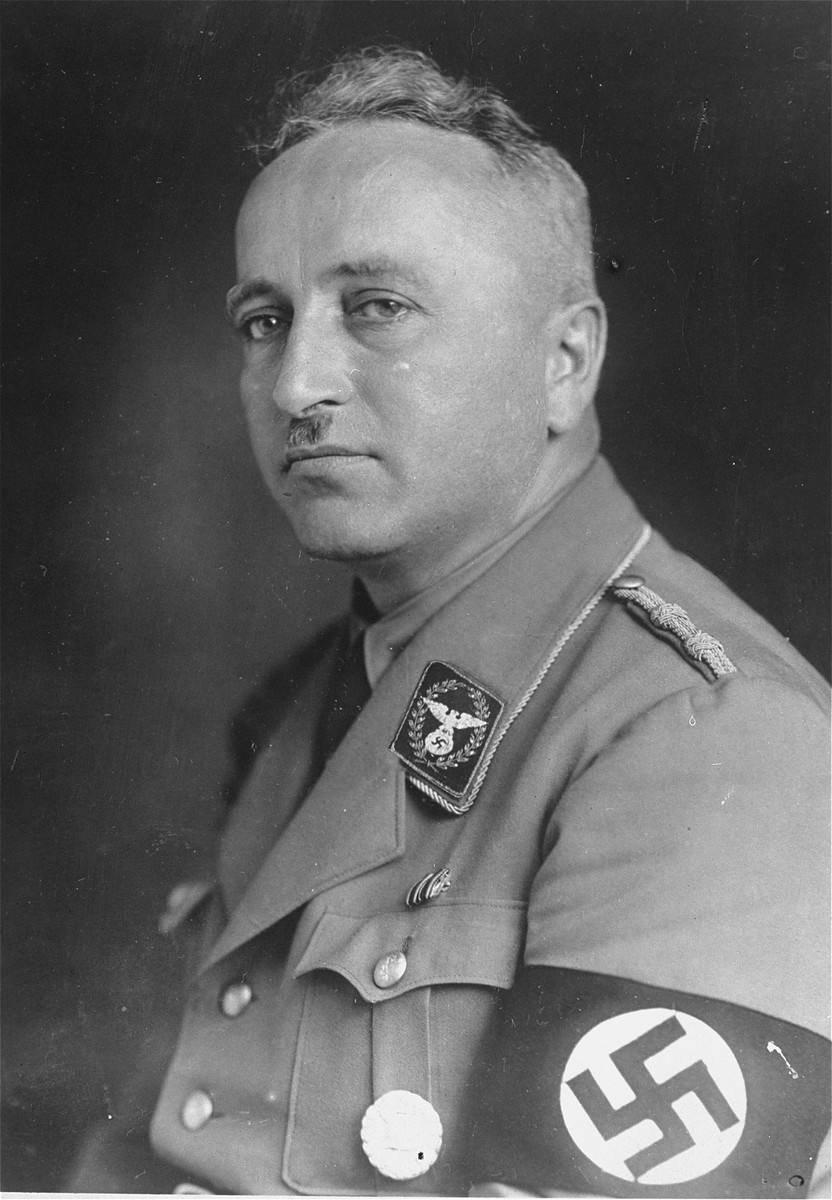
Head of KdF, Robert Ley

On November 27, 1933, Strength through Joy was announced by Robert Ley as a subset of the German Labour Front whose goal was to provide Germans with access to once-privileged leisure activities such as cruises and the ownership of motorcars. The government feared that increasing wages would dampen the rearmament process and decided to raise living standards differently to influence the opinion of Nazism, and paid for the program by taking deductions from workers' wages. By providing these luxuries, the government hoped that class divisions would be bridged leading to the building-up of a German Volksgemeinschaft (English: People's community) and that a common national consciousness would end class conflict, so as to enable all classes to work together for the greater benefit of the nation. A key feature of the people's community was the overall good physical health of the German people, in order to produce a population fit for military service and for work. In addition, it was believed that if workers were given sufficient leisure time and provided with cleaner workplaces morale and productivity would increase, aspects needed of the working class for the rearmament. It initially was intended to focus on controlling evening and weekend leisure time, but after positive reception of KdF train trips, tourism became an important priority.

=== Departments ===
KdF had a number of individual departments. The Beauty of Labour (Schönheit der Arbeit) department was devoted to improvements in the workplace, from general hygiene to reduction of sound pollution. Other departments included the Sports Office (Sportamt), Adult Education Office (Volksbildungswerk), Leisure Time Office (Amt Feierabend), the Office for Folklore and Homeland (Amt für Volkstum und Heimat), and the Office for Travel, Hiking, and Holidays (Amt für Reisen, Wandern, und Urlaub).

The Sports Office organized tennis, skiing, and likewise sports that the working class were previously unable to partake in. Its main concerns were in building 'everyday joy' and improving the health of the masses, and KdF took a keen interest in building the physicality and bodily strength of the German population. Physical education classes and gymnastic events were scheduled on weekends and after working hours, but also included skiing and hiking trips. It also encouraged workers to partake in physical exercise and sports, encouraging employers to provide access to facilities and equipment during work hours and after hours.

The Adult Education Office was headed by Fritz Leutloff. Its goal was to educate Germans on cultural and artistic topics. 'Popular education' programs had been taken over when the government began imposing Gleichschaltung, but the programs offered by the Adult Education Office were not centralized by KdF until 1936 when the Reichskulturkammer and KdF began stern cooperation. Plans had been proposed by 1939 to designate KdF as a chamber of culture, but ultimately fell through due to backlash from Alfred Rosenberg and Rudolf Hess.

The Leisure Time Office enabled workers to attend theatres and concerts by organizing local events and offering discounted tickets. It also organized concerts and events to take place in factories. As the Adult Education Office focused more on propaganda and refined education, the Leisure Time Office was more concerned with the recreational aspects of spare time.

The largest and most profitable department was the Office for Travel, Hiking, and Holidays, headed by Bodo Lafferentz. Organizing both domestic and international excursions, for the first time workers were able to travel at length. This was achieved by offering discounts on travel and tour packages, sending thousands of Germans on holidays before 1939.

The Office for Folklore and Homeland was tasked with organizing smaller Nazi organizations that promoted the 'folklore' and the idea of Lebensraum, but was dissolved in 1934.

== Activities ==
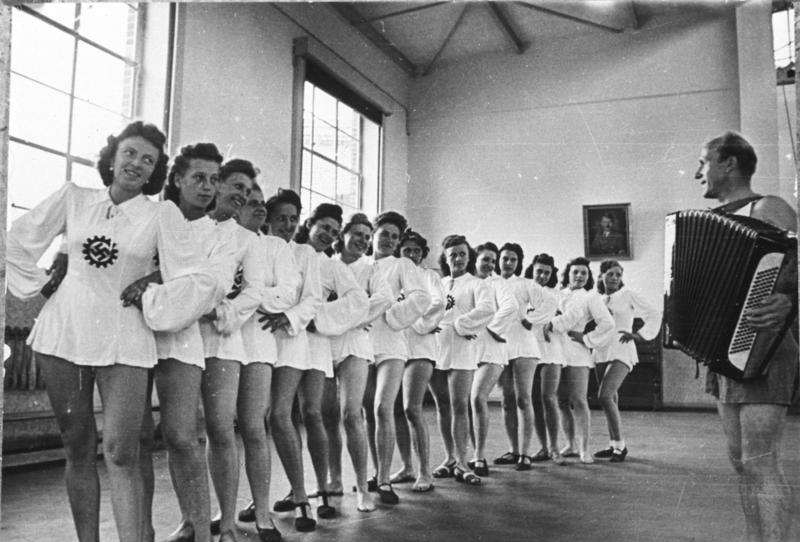
Dancing class of the KdF, 1933

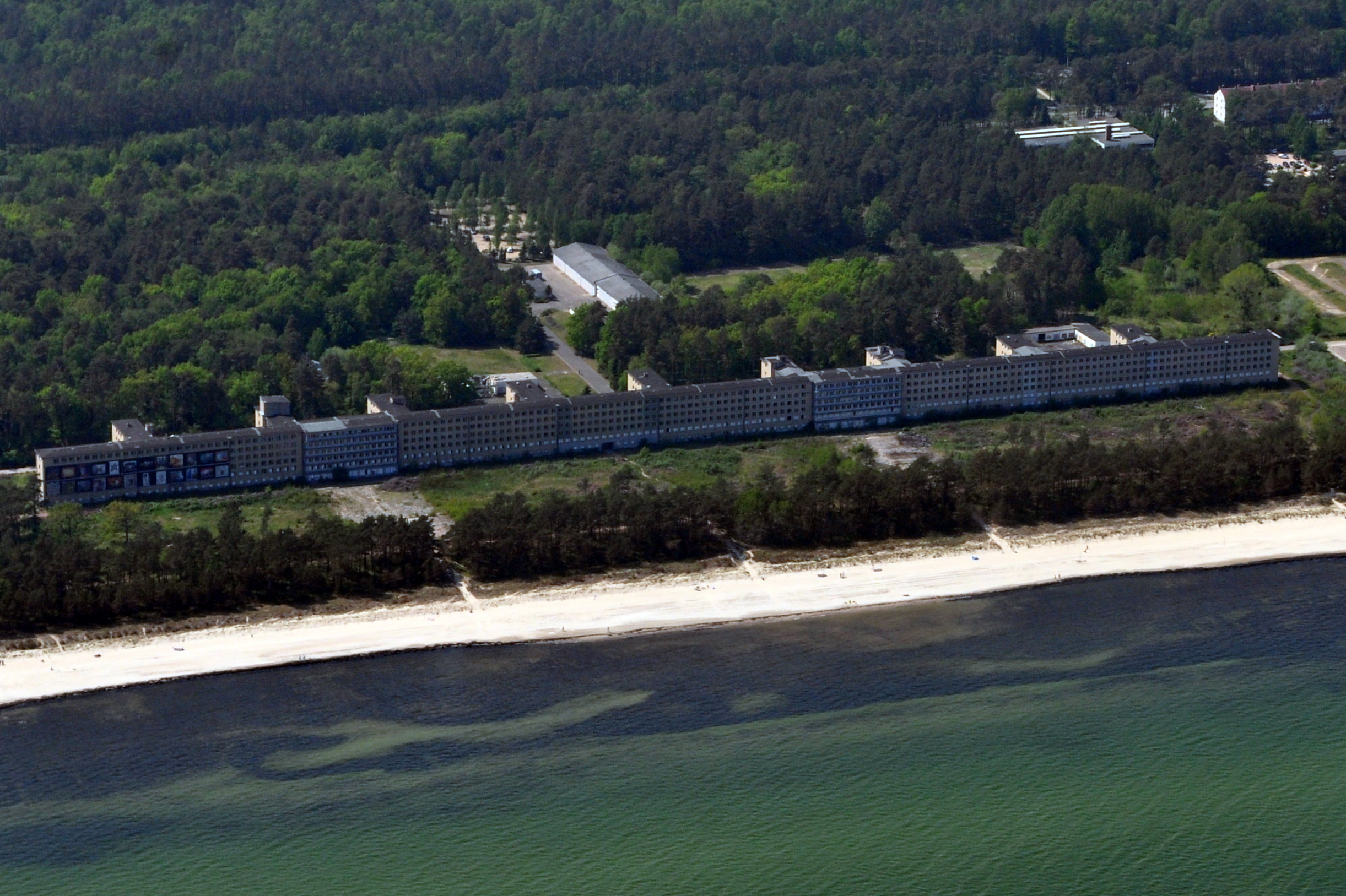
Prora, an unfinished KdF resort

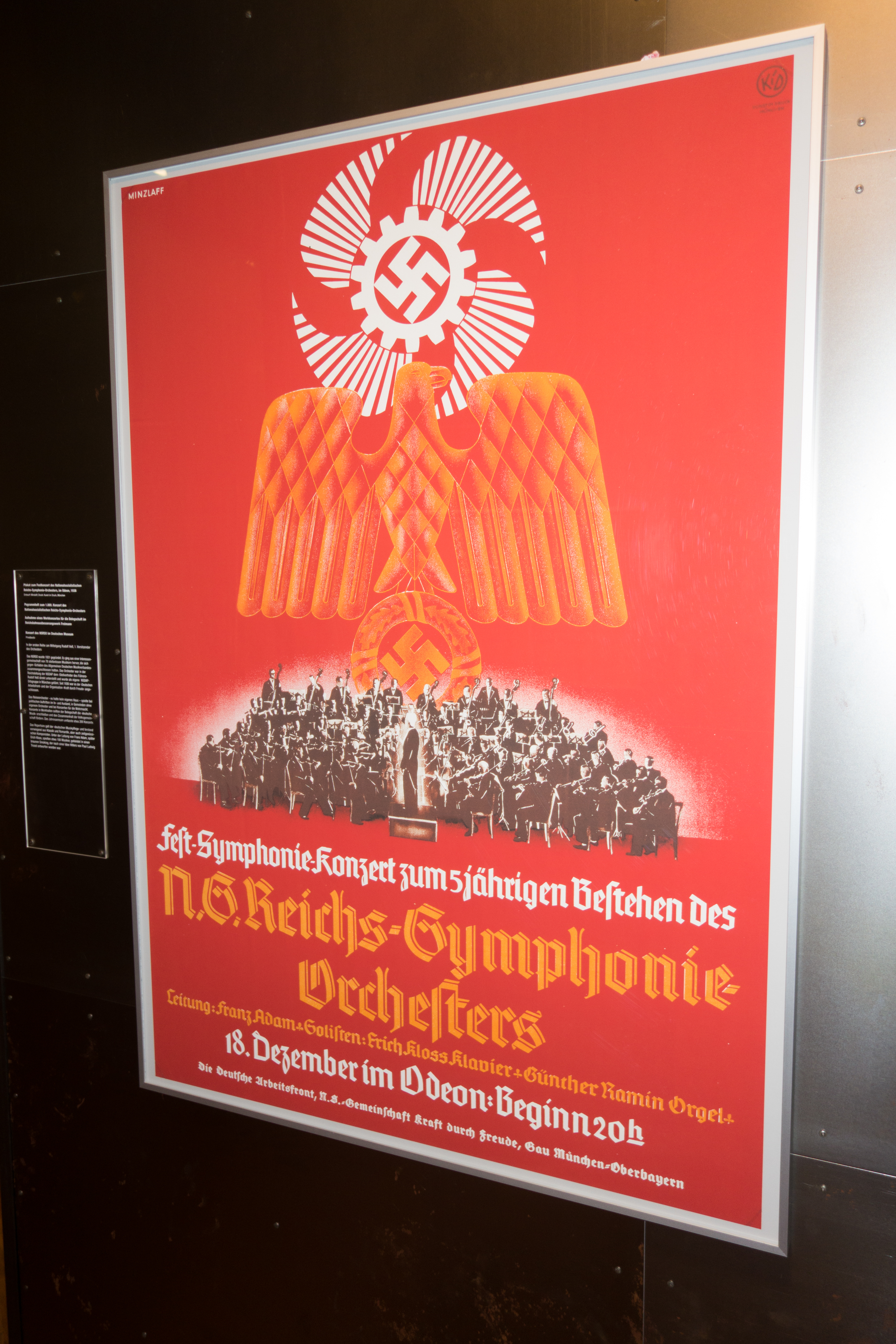
Poster promoting an N.S. Reich Symphony Orchestra performance

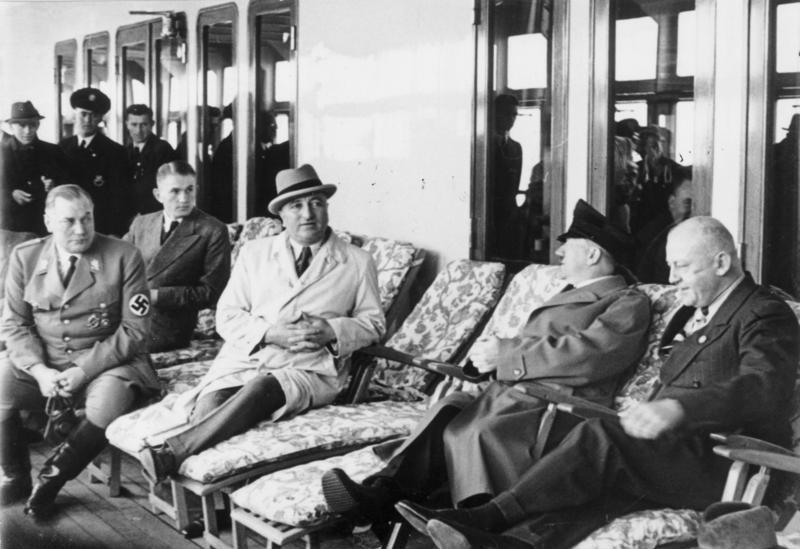
Adolf Hitler and Robert Ley aboard the Robert Ley in 1939

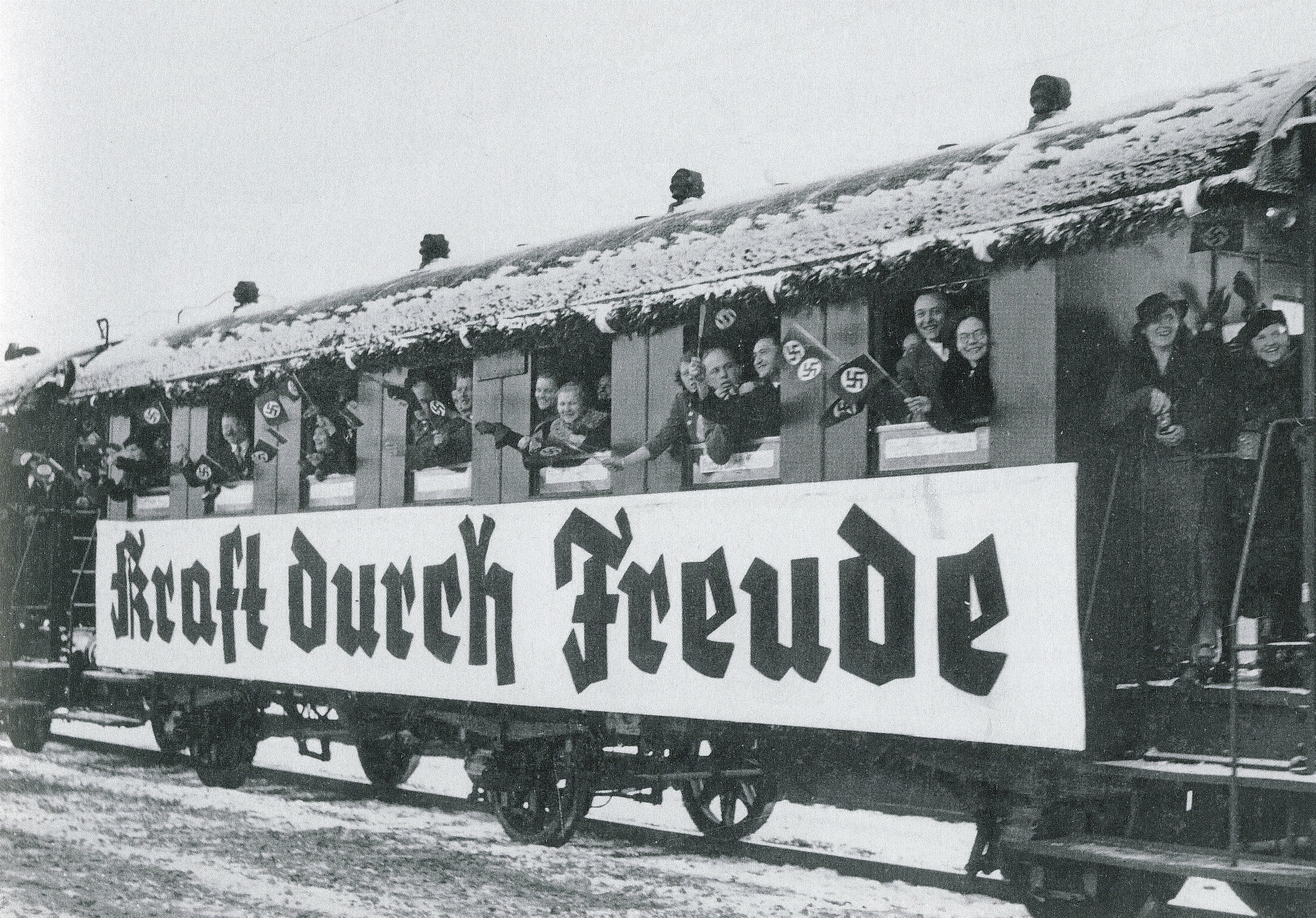
Travelers aboard a KdF train

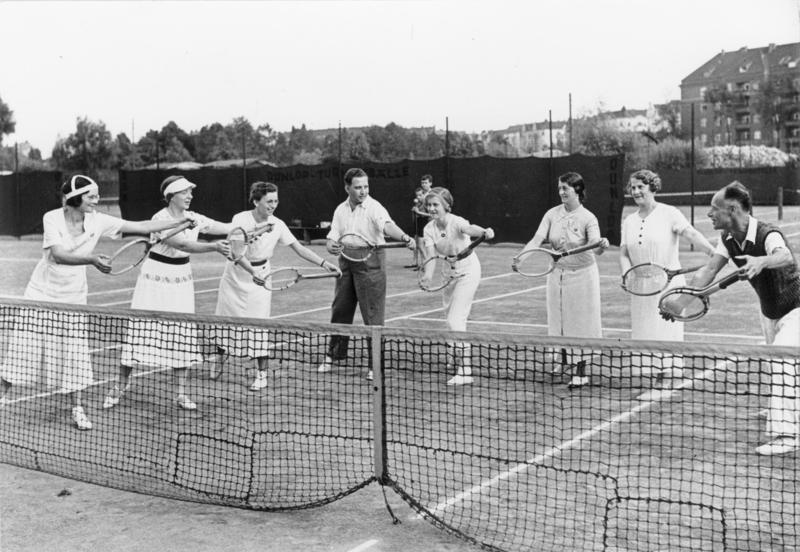
Tennis class of the KdF

Following its inception, KdF began to provide a wide range of activities at an affordable price, ranging from concerts and theatre trips to weekend trips and holidays. Workers could enter KdF competitions and win prizes that would send them and their families to local events, or on extended trips either in Germany or abroad. Many of their events occurring after the work day and on weekends: the government sought not only to create a positive and productive environment, but also to dissuade potential anti-state activities. By 1939, KdF had 7,000 employees and over 135,000 volunteers.

=== In the workplace ===
Borrowing from the Italian fascist organization Dopolavoro ('After Work'), but extending its influence into the workplace as well through the Beauty of Labour department, the KdF rapidly developed a wide range of activities and quickly grew into one of Nazi Germany's largest organizations. Wardens were posted in every factory and workshop employing more than 20 people. It strove to improve the hygiene of workplaces, by providing toilets, locker rooms, and proper washing facilities. It also looked to improve air quality and reduce noise for workers. The government offered tax incentives as encouragement, and by 1938 the conditions of 34,000 workplaces had improved considerably. This was largely achieved by workers completing renovations while on unpaid overtime.

KdF stressed that partaking in sports would encourage physical health and a healthy attitude, and as such the Sports Office began to organize physical education events for workers. Under supervision of the National Socialist League of the Reich for Physical Exercise, by 1936 sports and physical training were implemented in factories, and employees under the age of 18 were required to spend time in their workweek performing exercise. The Sports Office also pushed employers to build recreation facilities on work grounds, such as tennis courts, and offered tax incentives as encouragement. Official estimates by the German Labour Front show that by 1939, approximately 3,000 sports facilities were created and over 12 million sports courses were organized through these efforts. Overall, it sought heightened physical and mental health for workers, important aspects for potential citizens living in the 'people's community.'

The Leisure Time Office and Adult Education Office, seeking to educate adults in arts and culture as well as to ensure they spend their time profitably, took steps to provide access to events for workers. To do as such, exhibitions, concerts and cultural events were held within factories to ensure workers had the ability to attend. Exhibitions of art created by exclusively German artists, plays, musicals and concerts were organized and admission for workers was either very cheap or free. Some art exhibitions featured art created by workers, oftentimes created in classes organized by the KdF. At all exhibitions, the art was for sale. In some cases, renowned composers such as Wilhelm Brueckner-Rueggeberg and Wilhelm Furtwängler led the Berlin Philharmonic orchestra in these performances, while at other times concerts would be conducted by local composers and played by local orchestras.

=== At home and abroad ===
The Sports Office organized several sports events and classes throughout the operation of KdF. In the summer months, activities such as horse riding, sailing and swimming were offered with KdF emphasizing track and field activities. Gymnastics became an increasingly popular sport for German women during this time. During the winter, KdF organized activities such as skiing, ice skating and winter hiking. Most of its activities and events occurred on weekends, and its volunteers, who were mostly unsalaried schoolteachers, taught exercise and sports classes. KdF would use local school gymnasiums or meeting halls and offer courses people could attend without prior registration, known as 'open courses,' for the price of 30 pfennings per 90 minutes. 'Closed courses' required participants to register for the entire course, cost 80 pfennings per 90 minutes, and often covered more skilled sports such as boxing, golf and rowing. Activities organized early in KdF's existence often deliberately left out competition, training and expectations of high performance. This was intended to focus the course on the production of joy and improvement of the population's health. Another reason for it may have been that the government sought to prevent opposition between participating groups, and rather promote and encourage cooperation. In 1939, KdF was awarded the Olympic Cup by the International Olympic Committee.

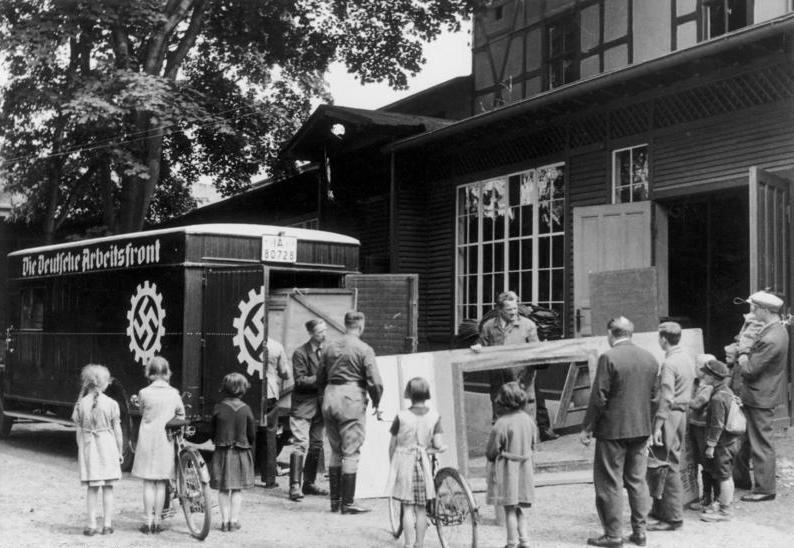
A KdF Theaterzug delivering equipment

The Leisure Time Office offered a variety of different activities and discounts for workers. Offering discounted ticket packages to theatres for films, musicals and plays for workers in cities, KdF also organized events to occur in rural areas by utilizing buses, called Theaterzüge, equipped with film projectors and loudspeakers as well as organizing productions using mobile stages. With the approval of the propaganda ministry, the Great Theatre (Großes Schauspielhaus) in Berlin was renamed the 'Theatre of the People' (Theater des Volkes) and was established as the official theatre of the KdF, with numerous other KdF theatres opening in major cities. The Adult Education Office similarly used these theatres for showings of propaganda films, alongside the film buses. Employing civilian performers as well as organizing performances of their own orchestras, by 1938 KdF had sponsored and offered ticket packages to performances such as As You Like It by William Shakespeare and Journey's End by R.C. Sherriff, but over time the performances would be replaced almost entirely by propagandistic pieces. Other notable performances included Wibbel the Tailor and The Land of Smiles. Following the declaration of total war, most musicians and performers utilized by the KdF were used for troop entertainment.

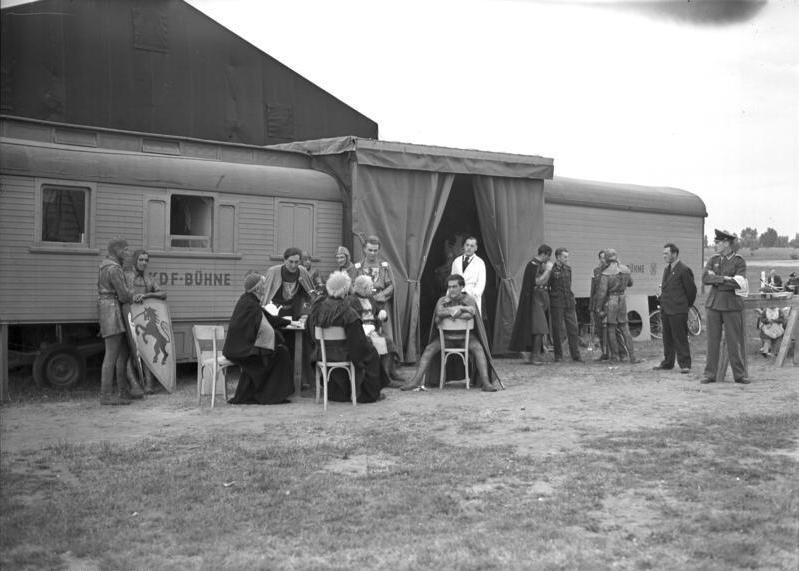
Traveling KdF theatre performers

The Office for Travel, Hiking, and Holidays offered various discounted vacation trips, ranging in length from day and weekend trips to one week or upwards of three weeks. Taking travelers via rail and bus to their destinations, within Germany or its occupied and annexed territories, the office organized activities such as hiking trips and swimming excursions. In most destinations hotelkeepers and some local businesses saw increased profits thanks to the increasing number of tourists, as did the Deutsche Reichsbahn (German National Railway). Popular extended holiday destinations included the Alps, the Black Forest, and the coasts of the North Sea and Baltic Sea, but most of the trips booked were overnight or over a weekend. Two weeks after the Anschluss, when SS-Gruppenführer Josef Bürckel became Reichskommissar für die Wiedervereinigung ('Reich Commissioner for Reunification') as well as Gauleiter, the first five KdF trains with some 2,000 Austrian workers left for Passau where they were ceremonially welcomed. While Bürckel announced that he did not expect all of the travelers to return as Nazis, he did expect them to look him in the eyes and say, "I tried hard to understand you." Many KdF travelers complained of their trips, noting poor travel conditions, second-class treatment by locals and the KdF alike, and little free time, thanks to the regimentation of activities. However, on the domestic trips, holidaymakers were usually left to their own devices and the vast majority were enthusiastic, especially those who had never traveled before in their lives.

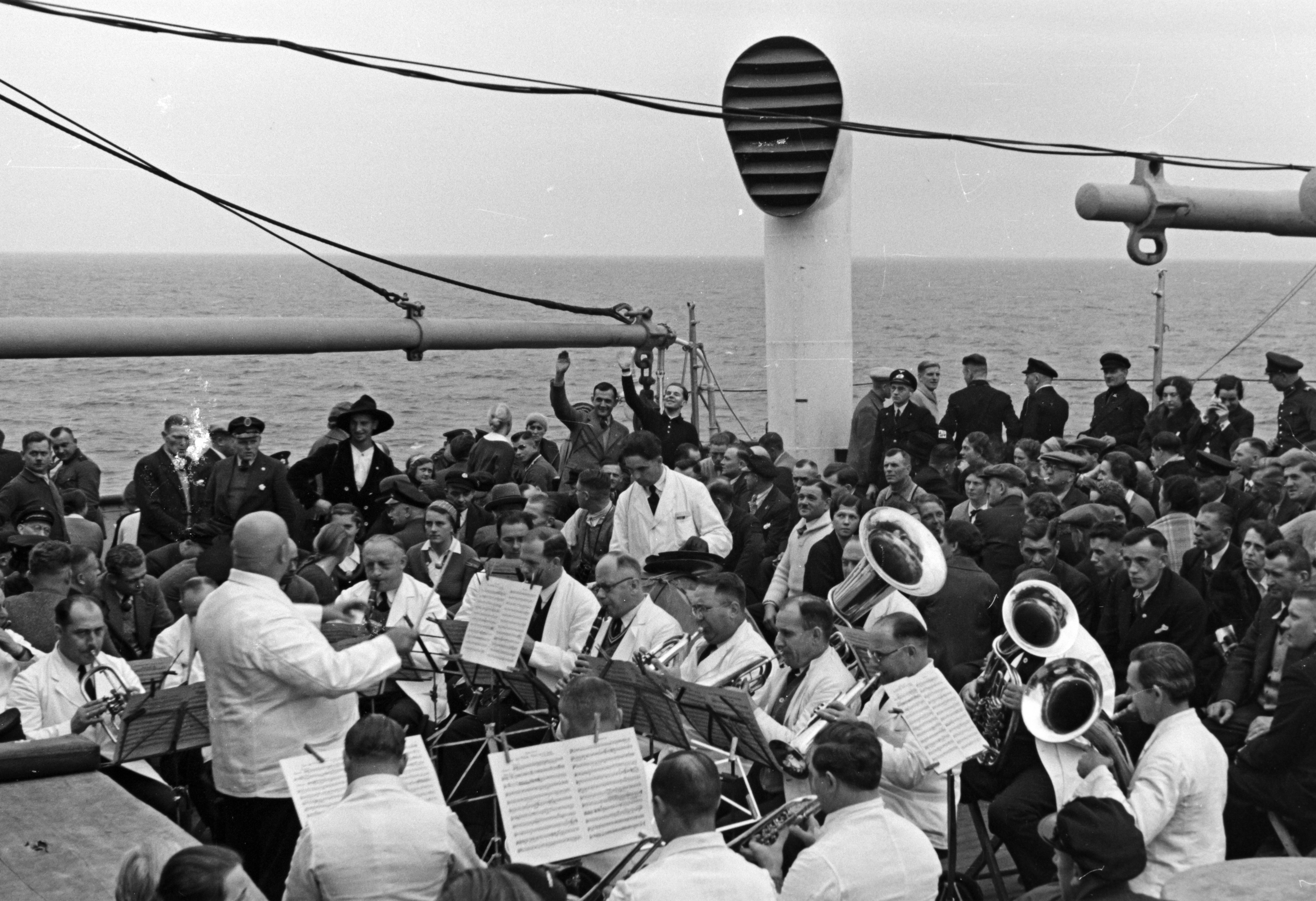
Travelers aboard a KdF cruise enjoying an orchestra performance

==== Cruise trips ====
Most famously, the office also offered discounted cruise trips to German citizens. Although not initially planned to be a program offered by KdF, the initial successes of the cruises led to six large ships, including the MV Wilhelm Gustloff, being built specifically for use by KdF while a further six were chartered. They were first ships to be built specifically for cruises. They were collectively known as the KdF fleet, with the MV Robert Ley being considered as its flagship. Ship events included masquerades, political and educational lectures, and events dedicated to displaying customs of individual German regions, such as shows of dance groups performing dances from their home regions. Cruise trips were largely affordable and sometimes offered as prizes in KdF competitions; an eighteen-day trip to Madeira cost 120 Reichsmarks, the equivalent to about four weeks' average salary at the time, and a seven-day trip to Norway cost about 50 Reichsmarks. Although cruises were inexpensive, workers were often greatly underrepresented on these voyages, with most of KdF's cruise participants being from the middle class. The KdF ships undertook trips to Norway, Spain, Portugal, and Italy (including Italian Libya).

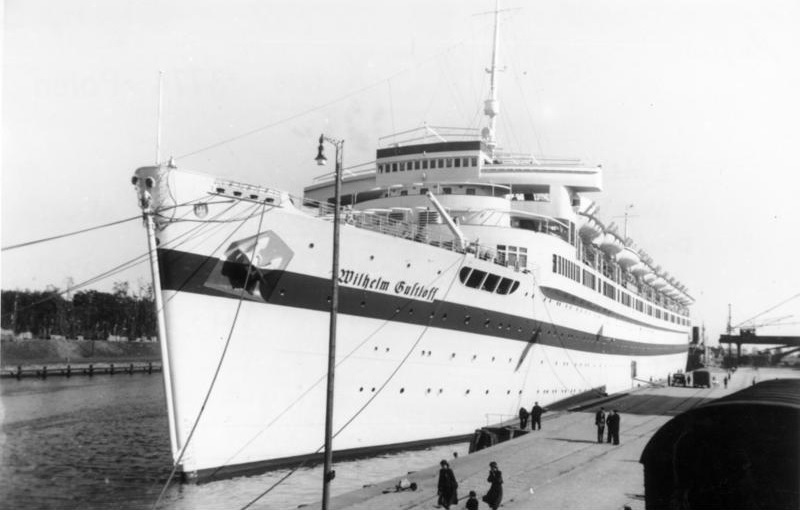
The cruise ship Wilhelm Gustloff served the Strength Through Joy program during 1937–1939

Through these cruises also Nazism was promoted internationally, and KdF travelers therefore were expected to represent it positively by dressing modestly and behaving appropriately. A lot of alcohol was consumed, but the government planted spies on ships instructed to pose as passengers and monitor participants' behavior. The Nazi government also sought to attract tourists from abroad, a task performed by Hermann Esser, one of the secretaries of the Ministerium für Volksaufklärung und Propaganda ('Ministry of Public Enlightenment and Propaganda'). A series of multilingual and colourful brochures, titled Deutschland, advertised Germany as a peaceful, idyllic and progressive country, on one occasion even portraying the ministry's boss, Joseph Goebbels, grinning in an unlikely photo series of the Cologne carnival.

After the outbreak of war, tourism opportunities were suspended and the organization shifted to more domestic activities and troop entertainment; up until this point, KdF had sold more than 45 million package tours and excursions, including over 700,000 sea voyages.

=== Wartime activities ===
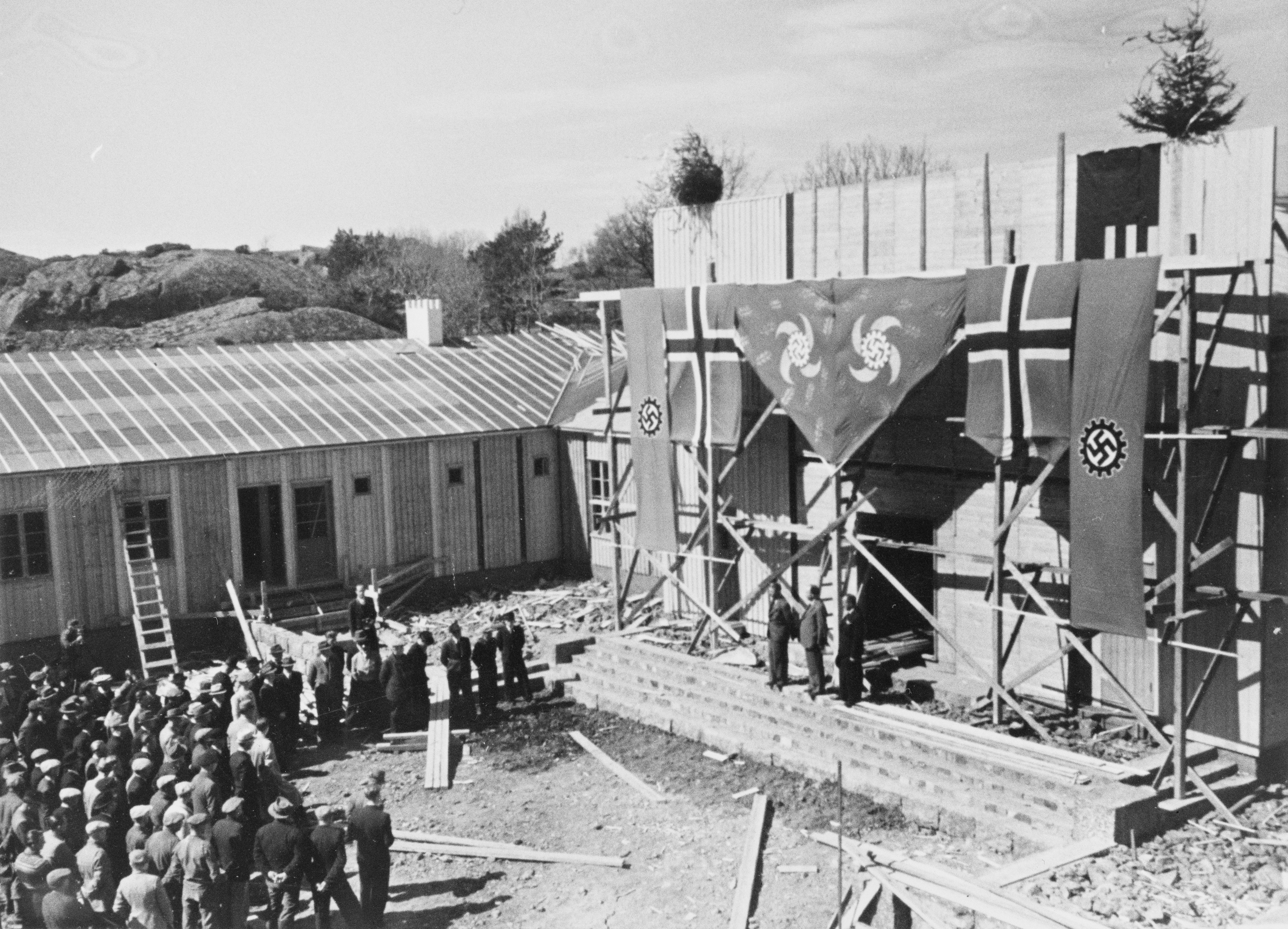
A KdF construction located in Stavern, Norway

KdF formed 'troop-care units' (Truppenbetreuung) in 1935, and after the invasion of Poland in 1939 the Ministry of Public Enlightenment and Propaganda created the 'Caring for the Troops' department of KdF, with Goebbels appointing Hans Hinkel as its head. The equivalent of the United States' USO, the troop-care units utilized portable stages and civilian performers such as musicians and actors, hiring them for up to 100 Reichsmarks per day. Many of the hired performers had little experience or were considered third-rate. By the end of 1941 it had become a massive program, as troop-care units had staged over 300,000 performances across every theater of war, including Africa.

Hinkel described the units in official propaganda as equally essential as the Wehrmacht, stating that soldiers and artists had a special bond through their allegiance to Hitler, and were "an essential part of modern war and human leadership in National Socialist Greater Germany." Seeking also to ensure the heightened physical and mental health of troops, other forms of light KdF entertainment were made available such as art exhibitions and sports. Entertainment by troop-care units was not exclusive to the Wehrmacht, as they were also tasked to put on shows for SS guards in concentration camps and 'Ethnic Germans' living in occupied territory. Germany's troop-care units remain a lightly researched topic.

Several KdF cruise ships were requisitioned into the Kriegsmarine and converted to serve as hospital ships. The Robert Ley was requisitioned in August 1939 and converted to serve as a hospital ship after only six months of operation. The ship would be converted several times to serve different purposes throughout World War II and was bombed by the Royal Air Force in the port of Hamburg on 9 March 1945 where the wreckage remained afloat until June 1947, when it was towed to the UK and scrapped. The MV Wilhelm Gustloff, requisitioned in September 1939, was designated as Lazarettschiff D and converted to serve as a hospital ship. In November 1940, medical equipment was removed from the ship and it was converted to serve as a barracks ship. Tasked with transporting civilians and military personnel during Operation Hannibal, the Lazarettschiff D was sunk on 30 January 1945 while returning to Germany from Prussia, killing an estimated 9,934. It was one of the deadliest maritime disasters in history.

== People's Car ==
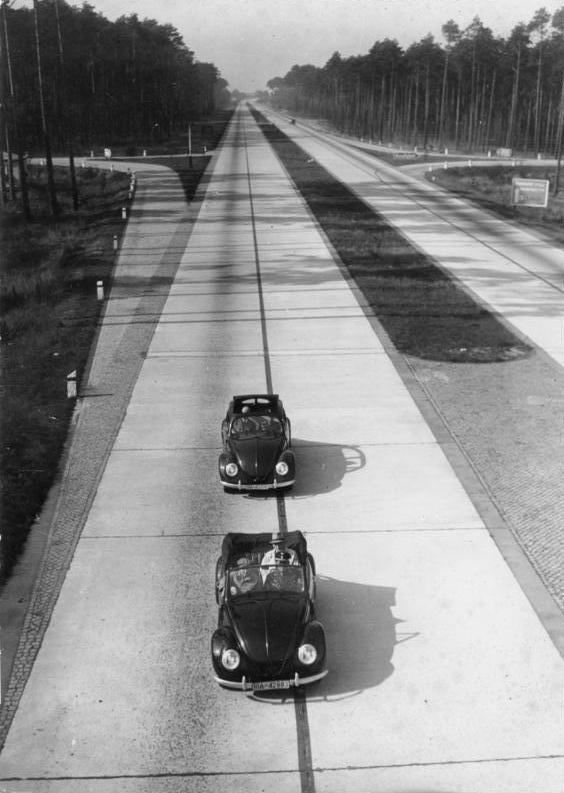
Volkswagens on an empty autobahn

KdF's most ambitious programme for German workers was to set up production of an affordable car, the KdF-Wagen, which later became the Volkswagen Beetle (Volkswagen being German for 'People's Car'). This was originally a project undertaken at Hitler's request by the engineer Ferdinand Porsche. When the German car industry was unable to meet Hitler's demand that the Volkswagen be sold at 1,000 Reichsmarks or less, the project was taken over by the German Labour Front (Deutsche Arbeitsfront; DAF). Now working for the DAF, Porsche built a new Volkswagen factory in Fallersleben at a huge cost, partly met by raiding the DAF's accumulated assets and misappropriating the dues paid by DAF members.

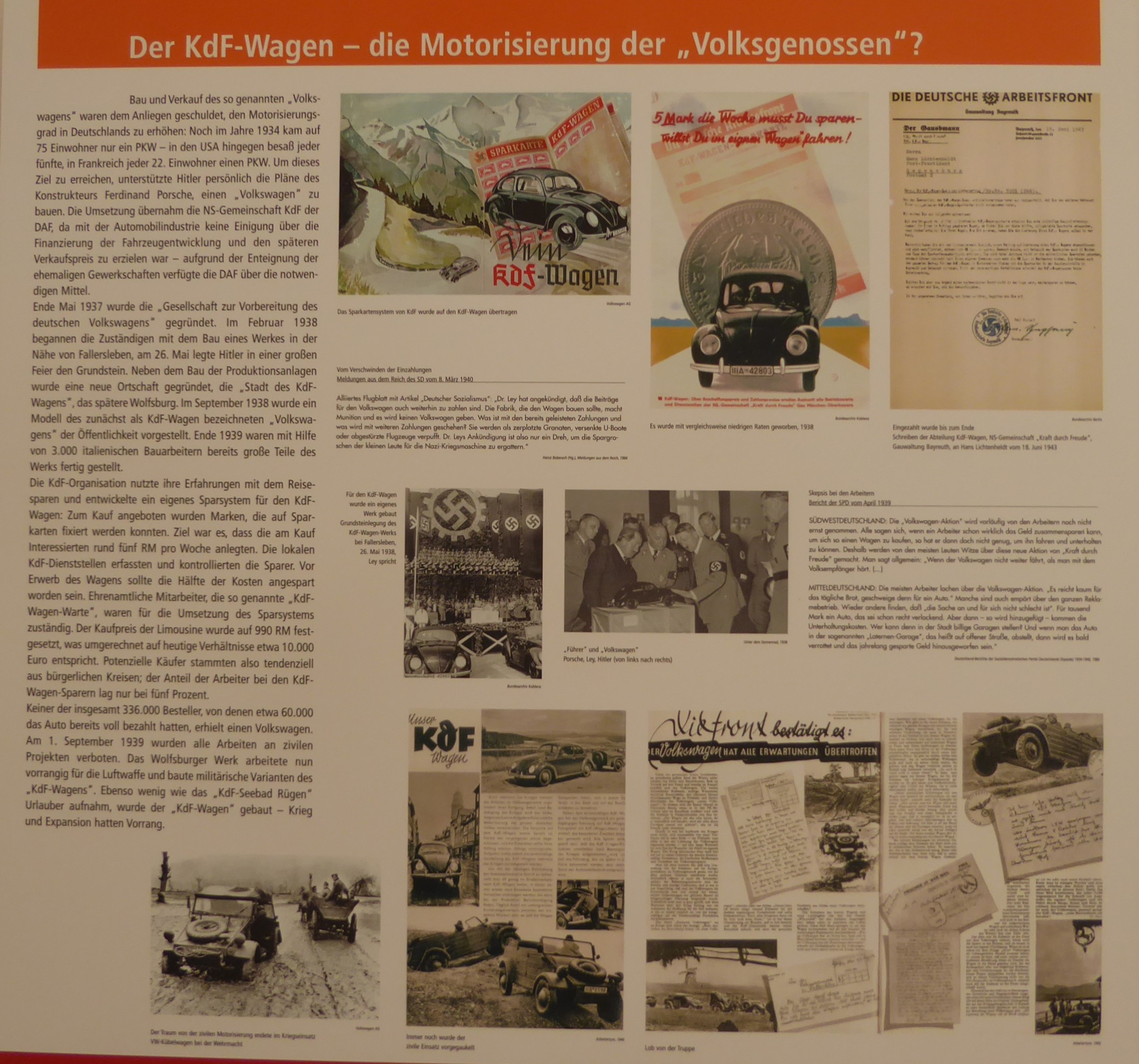
'Der KdF-Wagen' exhibit at Prora Documentation Centre, Binz, Rügen, on 17 07 2020

The Volkswagen was sold to German workers on an installment plan, where buyers of the car made payments and posted stamps in a stamp-savings book, which, when full, would be redeemed for the car. Due to the shift of wartime production, no private citizen ever received a KdF-Wagen, although after the war, Volkswagen did give some customers a 200 DM discount for their stamp-books. The Beetle factory was then primarily converted to produce the Kübelwagen, the German equivalent of the Jeep. The few Beetles that were produced went to the diplomatic corps and military officials.

== Propaganda ==
An important propaganda tool in Nazi Germany was the radio, something that Goebbels realized and attempted to utilize. At his request, engineer Otto Greissing developed the 'people's receiver,' or 'people's radio' (Volksempfänger.) The original model was the VE301 and exhibited in August 1933 at the cost of 76 Reichsmarks, the equivalent to two weeks' average salary at the time. A cheaper model was later produced, the DKE38 (sometimes called the Goebbels-Schnauze – "Goebbels' snout" – by the German public) and was used as the base of a KdF branded radio. Giving poor Germans access to this medium for the first time, it cost 35 Reichsmarks and the option of paying with an installment plan was offered.

Cheaply produced, these radios suffered from a short reception range, but it was deemed acceptable as long as the radios could receive Deutschlandsender and the local Reichssender. The radios were designed to be produced as cheaply as possible, and because the act of listening to non-German radio stations had become a criminal offense, it is speculated that the short reception range was a purposeful feature. Penalties ranged from fines and confiscation of radios to, particularly later in the war, sentencing to a concentration camp or capital punishment.

A number of films were produced to promote KdF, usually showing workers engaging in the many activities offered by the organization. One, for example, was produced by UFA titled Henkel – ein deutsches Werk in seiner Arbeit, which showcased the improved conditions of factories. Groups were shown engaging in calisthenics, going on walks through company grounds, and checking out books from the company library.

== After work ==
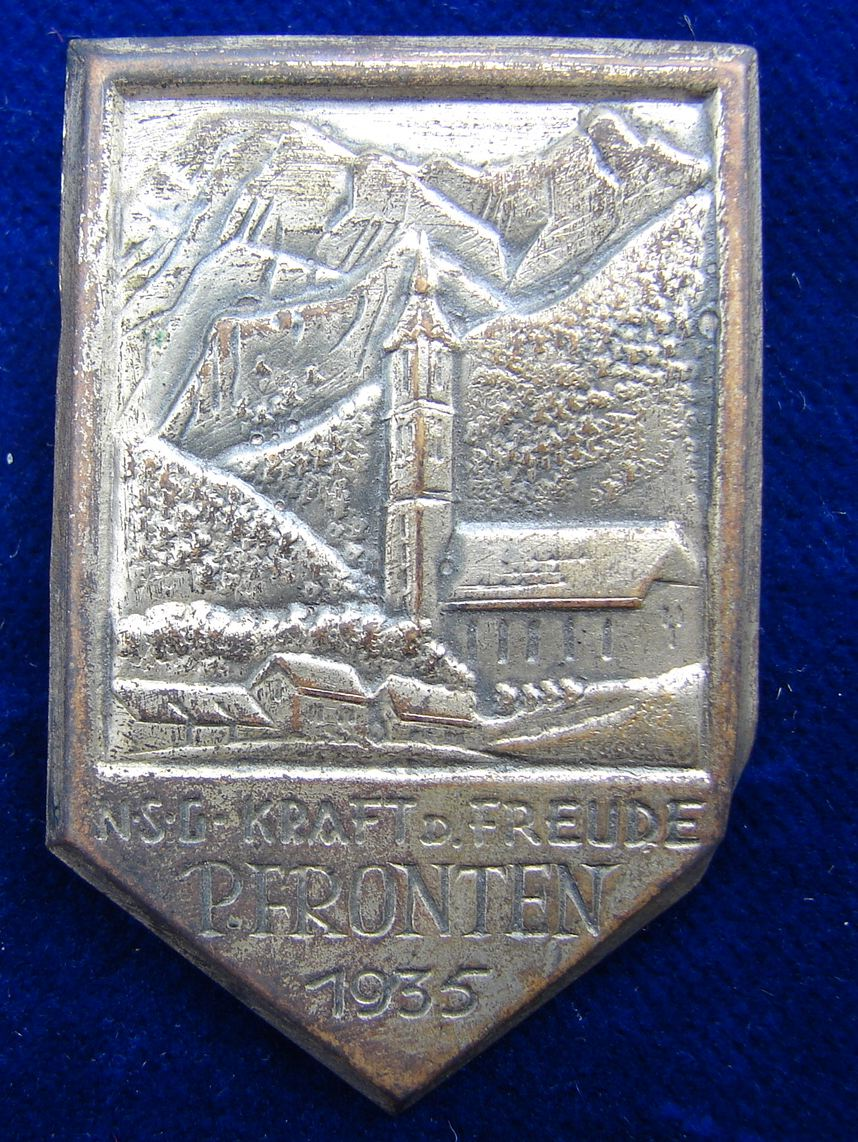
1935 KdF pin depicting the Catholic St. Nikolaus Church in Pfronten, Allgäu

The Feierabendgestaltung ('After-work organization') was the "planned" structuring of daily leisure time within KdF's programme, attempted by the Nazis through individual state agencies, including the Amt Feierabend ('Office for After-Work Activity') and the Amt Volksbildungswerk ('Office for Popular Education') and the Amt Schlafen ('Office for Sleep') that regulated when workers went to bed and when they woke up. In Nazi Germany, the term "after-work organization" was increasingly applied to the entire area of organized leisure activity, including holidays.

== See also ==
- German labour law
- Volksflugzeug ('People's Aircraft')
