= Beauty of Labour =

Nazi propaganda organization

- Schönheit der Arbeit
- Abbreviation: SdA
- Formation: 27 November 1933
- Dissolved: 1945
- Headquarters: Kaiserallee 25, Berlin, Germany
- Reichsamtsleiter of the Beauty of Labour: Albert Speer
- Parent organization: German Labour Front

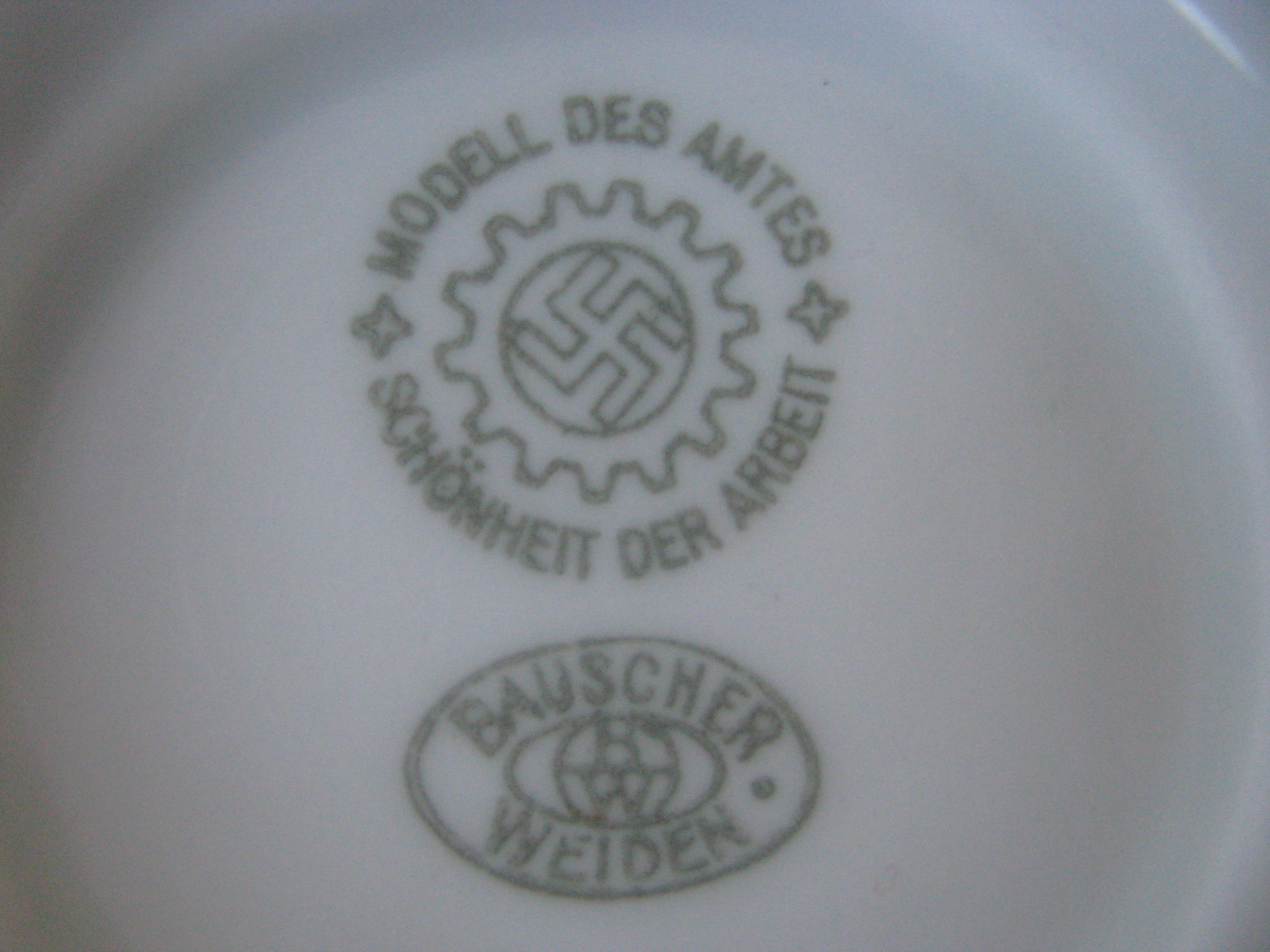
Beauty of Labour stamp on a cup

Beauty of Labour (German: Schönheit der Arbeit; SdA) was a propaganda organization of the Nazi government from 1934 to its eventual disbandment in 1945. One of its principal functions was workplace design and the beautification of the German work environment.

== Organisation ==
Initially a propaganda machine, the SdA worked bilaterally with its counterpart organisation Strength Through Joy (KdF) to achieve overall appeasement of the general population. The organization campaigned for improved cleanliness, better hygiene, proper work attire, changing rooms, lockers, better air, and less noise in factories and other places of employment. The SdA was one of the many areas that made up the Deutsche Arbeitsfront (DAF or "German Labour Front"), and was directed by Albert Speer.

== Activities ==
Campaigns such as the Join the fight against noise and Good ventilation in the workplace gave the National-Socialist state the ability to stimulate productivity within the workplace while simultaneously installing a sense of community and greater cordiality between the government and the German population. However, these improvements had to be paid for by the factory owners and managers, and improvements had to be made by the workers themselves, rather than directly funded by the government. Consequently, the workers performed these improvements for free at no additional pay.

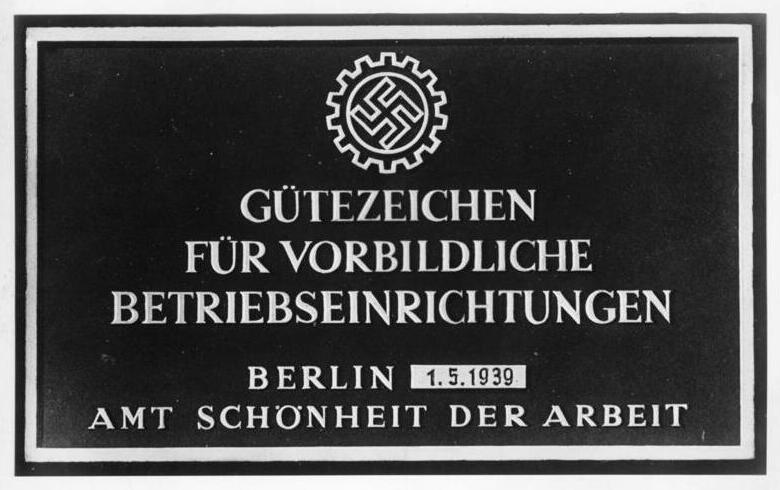
German Federal Archives Image 146-1987-085-20, Quality Mark of the DAF

== Bibliography ==
- Childers, Thomas (2017). The Third Reich: A History of Nazi Germany. New York: Simon & Schuster. ISBN 978-1-45165-113-3.
- Evans, Richard (2006). The Third Reich in Power. New York: Penguin. ISBN 978-0-14303-790-3.
- Welch, David (1995). The Third Reich: Politics and Propaganda. New York: Routledge. ISBN 0-415-27507-5.
- Zentner, Christian; Bedürftig, Friedemann (1991). The Encyclopedia of the Third Reich. New York: MacMillan Publishing. ISBN 0-02-897500-6.
