= 1932 Berlin transport strike =

Labor dispute in Berlin, Germany

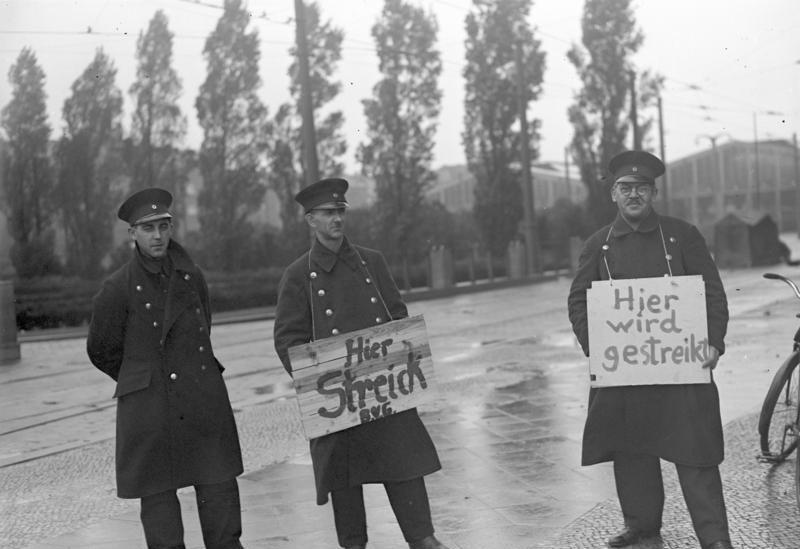
Berliner transport workers striking Berliner Verkehrsgesellschaft.

The 1932 Berlin transport strike was an industrial labor dispute in Berlin, during the Weimar Republic period of interwar Germany. It took place in the context of the November 1932 German federal election, which was held on 6 November, 1932.

== History ==
The employers, the Berliner Verkehrsgesellschaft (BVG), were responsible for public transport in Berlin. It was one of the most significant strikes in the last days of the Weimar Republic. The strike began on 3 November. It was solid apart from one or two token trams run by management which hardly any passengers boarded. On 4 November the strike was declared illegal and armed police were placed on the few trams which made "demonstrative trips". The strikers blocked depots, ripped up track and fought with the police. There were over 500 arrests and four people were killed by the police. The strike ended on Monday 7 November, the day after the elections.

It was organised principally by the Revolutionäre Gewerkschafts Opposition' or RGO (Revolutionary Trade Union Opposition), a union which had been founded by the Communist Party of Germany following their adoption of the concept of the Third Period, by which Social Democracy was castigated as social fascism. The strike was also supported by the Nazi labor union National Socialist Factory Cell Organization.

== See also ==
- 1930s in Berlin
- Weimar Republic topics
