= Robert Ley =

German politician (1890–1945)

- Ley in the 1930s

Reich Organization Leader of the German Nazi Party
- In office 10 November 1934 – 8 May 1945
- Preceded by: Adolf Hitler
- Succeeded by: Position abolished

Head of the German Labour Front
- In office 10 May 1933 – 8 May 1945
- Leader: Adolf Hitler
- Preceded by: Position established
- Succeeded by: Position abolished

Chief of Staff of the Nazi Party Reich Organization Leader
- In office 9 December 1932 – 10 November 1934
- Leader: Adolf Hitler
- Preceded by: Gregor Strasser
- Succeeded by: Position abolished

Gauleiter of Southern Rhineland, later Rhineland
- In office 17 July 1925 – 31 May 1931
- Preceded by: Heinrich Haake
- Succeeded by: Position abolished

Additional positions
- 1940—1945: Reichskommissar for Social Housing Construction
- 1933—1945: Member of the Prussian State Council
- 1933–1945: Reichsleiter of the Nazi Party
- 1933–1945: Member of the Greater German Reichstag
- June – December 1932: Reichsinspecteur of the Nazi Party
- 1930–1933: Member of the Reichstag

Personal details
- Born: 15 February 1890 Niederbreidenbach, Germany
- Died: 25 October 1945 (aged 55) Nuremberg, Germany
- Cause of death: Suicide by hanging
- Party: Nazi Party (1925-1945)
- Spouse(s): Elisabeth Schmidt (m. 1921; div. 1938) Inga Ursula Spilcker (m. 1938; died 1942)
- Children: 5
- Education: University of Jena; University of Bonn; University of Münster
- Known for: Head of the German Labour Front (1933–1945)

Military service
- Allegiance: German Empire
- Branch/service: Imperial German Army
- Years of service: 1914–1920
- Rank: Leutnant
- Unit: 10th Foot Artillery Regiment
- Battles/wars: World War I
- Awards: Iron Cross 2nd class Wound Badge, in silver

Robert Ley (German: [ˈʁoːbɛʁt ˈlaɪ]; 15 February 1890 – 25 October 1945) was a German Nazi politician and head of the German Labour Front during its entire existence, from 1933 to 1945. He also held many other high positions in the Nazi Party, including Gauleiter, Reichsleiter and Reichsorganisationsleiter.

The son of a farmer from the Rhine Province, Ley saw action in both the eastern and western fronts of the First World War and received the Iron Cross Second Class. After the war, he resumed his studies in chemistry, obtained his doctorate, and worked for IG Farben as a food chemist. Radicalised following the French occupation of the Ruhr, Ley joined the Nazi Party in 1925 and subsequently became the Gauleiter of Southern Rhineland (later Rhineland). Steadily rising through the ranks, he was elected to the Reichstag in 1930, and replaced Gregor Strasser as Reichsorganisationsleiter in 1932.

In 1933, Hitler appointed Ley as the head of the newly founded German Labour Front following the suppression of the trade unions. In addition to facilitating German rearmament, Ley also presided over the creation of a number of programs, including Strength Through Joy and the Volkswagen. Ley's influence declined after the outbreak of the Second World War, his role as leader of the German workforce supplanted by Fritz Todt (and later Albert Speer) and his alcoholism gradually coming into focus. Nevertheless, he retained Hitler's favour, and remained part of Hitler's inner circle until the last months of the war.

Ley was captured by American paratroopers near the Austrian border at the end of the war. He committed suicide in October 1945 while awaiting trial at Nuremberg for crimes against humanity and war crimes.

== Early life ==
Ley was born in Niederbreidenbach (now a part of Nümbrecht) in the Rhine Province, the seventh of 11 children of a farmer, Friedrich Ley, and his wife Emilie (née Wald). He studied chemistry at the universities of Jena, Bonn, and Münster. He volunteered for the army on the outbreak of World War I in 1914 and spent two years in the 10th Foot Artillery Regiment and saw action on both the eastern and western fronts. In 1916 he was promoted to Leutnant and trained as an aerial artillery spotter with Artillery Flier Detachment 202. In July 1917 his aircraft was shot down over France and he was taken prisoner of war. It has been suggested that he suffered a traumatic brain injury in the crash; for the rest of his life he spoke with a stammer and suffered bouts of erratic behaviour, aggravated by heavy drinking. He earned the Iron Cross, 2nd class and the Wound Badge, in silver.

After the war Ley was released from captivity in January 1920 and returned to university, gaining a doctorate later that year. He was employed as a food chemist by a branch of the giant IG Farben company, based in Leverkusen in the Ruhr. Enraged by the French occupation of the Ruhr in 1924, Ley became an ultra-nationalist and joined the Nazi Party soon after reading Adolf Hitler's speech at his trial following the Beer Hall Putsch in Munich. Ley proved unswervingly loyal to Hitler, which led Hitler to ignore complaints about his arrogance, incompetence and drunkenness.

Ley's impoverished upbringing and his experience as head of the largely working-class Rhineland party region meant that he was sympathetic to the Strasserite elements in the party, but he always sided with Hitler in inner party disputes. This helped him survive the hostility of other party officials such as the party treasurer, Franz Xaver Schwarz, who regarded him as an incompetent drunk.

== Rise in the Nazi Party ==
Ley rejoined the re-founded Nazi Party in March 1925, shortly after the party's ban was lifted (membership number 18,441). He was named Deputy Gauleiter of the Southern Rhineland (later, Rhineland) that month, and was promoted to Gauleiter on 17 July. In September 1925, he became a member of the National Socialist Working Association, a short-lived group of northern and western German Gauleiters, organized and led by Gregor Strasser, which advocated a more working-class focus for the Party and unsuccessfully sought to amend the Party program. At a meeting on 24 January 1926, however, Ley joined with others in raising objections to Strasser's proposed new draft program and it was shelved. Shortly thereafter, the Working Association was dissolved following the Bamberg Conference.

In March 1928, Ley became the editor and publisher of a virulently anti-Semitic Nazi newspaper, the Westdeutscher Beobachter (West German Observer) in Cologne. On 20 May 1928, he was elected to the Prussian Landtag, and also was appointed to the provincial parliament of the Rhine Province. He was first elected to the Reichstag in September 1930 from electoral constituency 20, Cologne-Aachen, a seat he retained until May 1945. He remained as the Gauleiter of Rhineland until 1 June 1931 when his Gau was divided into two and new leaders named.

On 21 October 1931, Ley was brought to Munich party headquarters as the Deputy to Strasser, then the head of party organization. Ley was styled Reichsorganisationsinspekteur and conducted inspection visits to the various Gaue. On 10 June 1932, following a further organizational restructuring by Strasser, Ley was named one of two Reichsinspecteurs with oversight of approximately half the Gaue. Furthermore, he was made the Acting Landesinspekteur for Bavaria with direct responsibility for the six Bavarian Gaue. This was a short-lived initiative by Strasser to centralize control over the Gaue. However, it was unpopular with the Gauleiters and was repealed on Strasser's fall from power. Strasser resigned on 8 December 1932 in a break with Hitler over the future direction of the Party. Hitler himself took over as Reichsorganisationsleiter and installed Ley as his Stabschef (Chief of Staff). The positions of Reichsinspecteur and Landesinspekteur were abolished. When Hitler became Reich Chancellor in January 1933, Ley accompanied him to Berlin. On 2 June 1933, Ley was among those raised to Reichsleiter, the second highest political rank in the Nazi Party. This was followed on 14 September 1933 by his appointment to the reconstituted Prussian State Council by Prussian Minister-President Hermann Göring. On 3 October 1933, Ley was named to Hans Frank's Academy for German Law and, on 10 November 1934, Hitler finally formally promoted Ley to the position of Reichsorganisationsleiter. Ley would retain these positions until the fall of the Nazi regime.

== Labour Front head ==
Flag of Robert Ley's German Labour Front

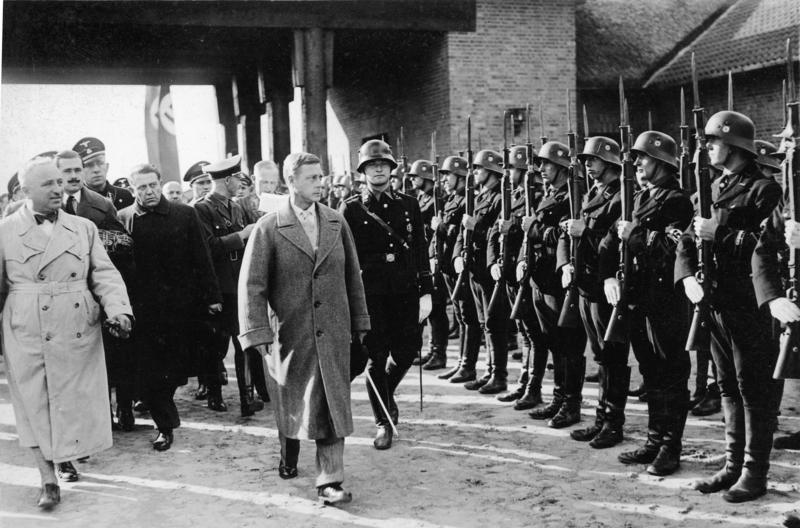
Prince Edward, Duke of Windsor reviewing SS guards with Robert Ley, 1937

By April, 1933 Hitler decided to have the Nazi Party take over the trade union movement. On 10 May 1933, Hitler appointed Ley head of the newly founded German Labour Front (Deutsche Arbeitsfront, DAF). The DAF took over the existing Nazi trade union formation, the National Socialist Factory Cell Organisation (Nationalsozialistische Betriebszellenorganisation, NSBO) as well as the main trade union federation. But Ley's lack of administrative ability meant that the NSBO leader, Reinhold Muchow, a member of the Strasserite wing of the Nazi Party, soon became the dominant figure in the DAF, overshadowing Ley. Muchow began a purge of the DAF administration, rooting out ex-Social Democrats and ex-Communists and placing his own militants in their place.

The NSBO cells continued to agitate in the factories on issues of wages and conditions, annoying the employers, who soon complained to Hitler and other Nazi leaders that the DAF was as bad as the Communists had been.

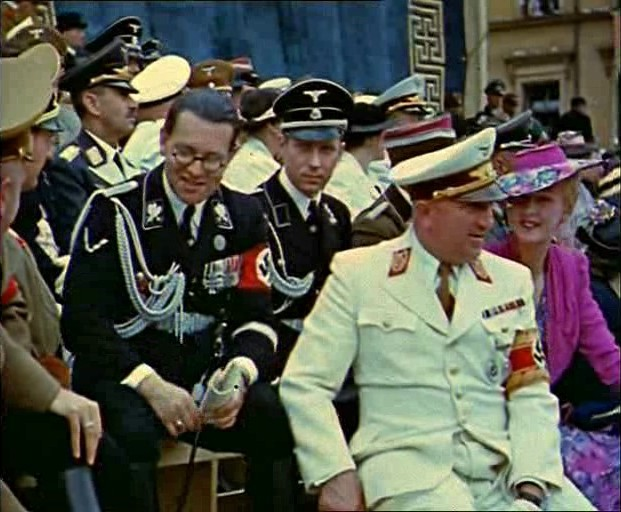
Philipp Bouhler, Karl Freiherr Michel von Tüßling, and Robert Ley, in white uniform, with his wife Inga (Munich, July 1939)

Hitler had no sympathy with the syndicalist tendencies of the NSBO, and in January 1934 a new Law for the Ordering of National Labour effectively suppressed independent working-class factory organisations, even Nazi ones, and put questions of wages and conditions in the hands of the Trustees of Labour (Treuhänder der Arbeit), dominated by the employers. Around this time Muchow died in a tavern brawl and Ley's control over the DAF was re-established. The NSBO was completely suppressed and the DAF became little more than an arm of the state for the more efficient deployment and disciplining of labour to serve the needs of the regime, particularly its massive expansion of the arms industry.

As head of the Labour Front, Ley invited Prince Edward, Duke of Windsor, and Wallis, Duchess of Windsor, to conduct a tour of Germany in 1937, months after Edward had abdicated the British throne. Ley served as their host and their personal chaperone. During the visit, Ley's alcoholism was noticed, and at one point he crashed the Windsors' car into a gate.

Once his power was established, Ley began to abuse it in a way that was conspicuous even by the standards of the Nazi regime. On top of his generous salaries as DAF head, Reichsorganisationsleiter, and Reichstag deputy, he pocketed the large profits of the Westdeutscher Beobachter, and freely embezzled DAF funds for his personal use. By 1938 he owned a luxurious estate near Cologne, a string of villas in other cities, a fleet of cars, a private railway carriage and a large art collection. He increasingly devoted his time to "womanising and heavy drinking, both of which often led to embarrassing scenes in public."

On 29 December 1942 his second wife Inga Ursula Spilcker (1916–1942) shot herself after a drunken brawl. Ley's subordinates took their lead from him, and the DAF became a notorious centre of corruption, all paid for with the compulsory dues paid by German workers. One historian says: "The DAF quickly began to gain a reputation as perhaps the most corrupt of all the major institutions of the Third Reich. For this, Ley himself had to shoulder a large part of the blame."

== Strength Through Joy ==
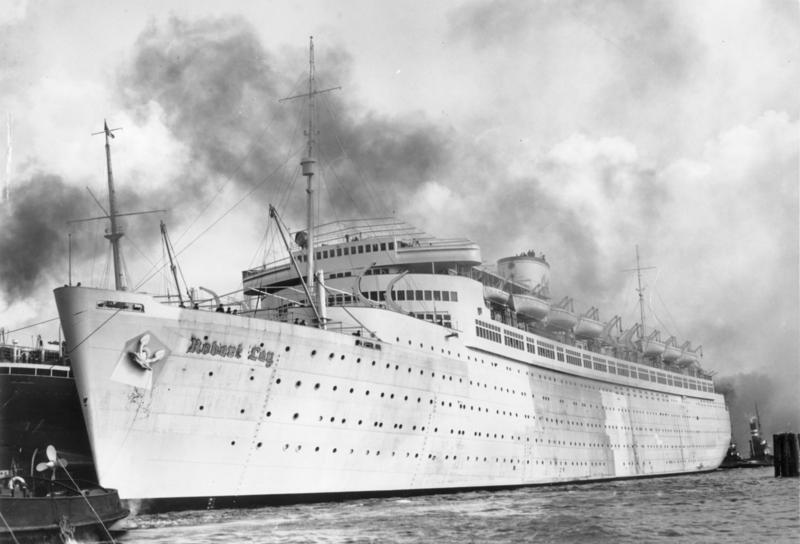
The KDF-Schiff Robert Ley, March 1939

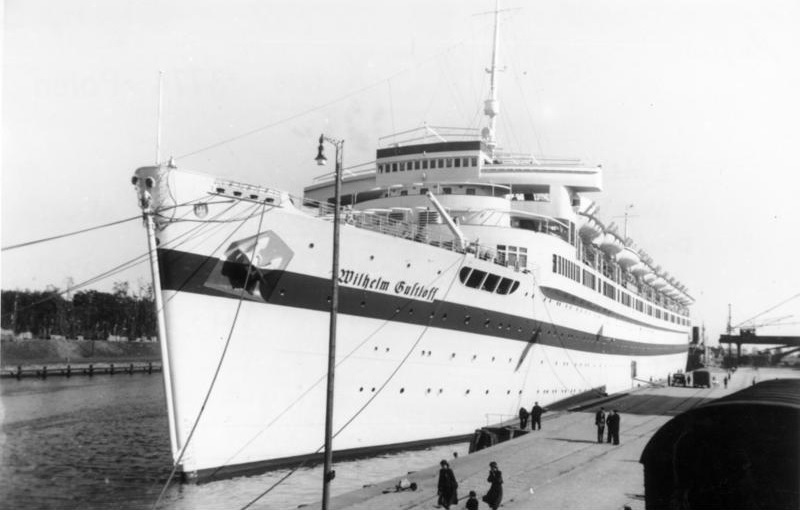
The KDF-Schiff Wilhelm Gustloff, 23 September 1939

Hitler and Ley were aware that the suppression of the trade unions and the prevention of wage increases by the Trustees of Labour system, when coupled with their relentless demands for increased productivity to hasten German rearmament, created a real risk of working-class discontent. In November 1933, as a means of preventing labour disaffection, the DAF established Strength Through Joy (Kraft durch Freude, KdF), to provide a range of benefits and amenities to the German working class and their families. These included subsidised holidays both at resorts across Germany and in "safe" countries abroad (particularly Italy). Two of the world's first purpose-built cruise-liners, the Wilhelm Gustloff and the Robert Ley, were built to take KdF members on Mediterranean cruises.

Other KdF programs included concerts, opera and other forms of entertainment in factories and other workplaces, free physical education and gymnastics training and coaching in sports such as football, tennis and sailing. All this was paid for by the DAF, at a cost of 29 million ℛ︁ℳ︁ a year by 1937, and ultimately by the workers themselves through their dues, although the employers also contributed. KdF was one of the Nazi regime's most popular programs, and played a large part in reconciling the working class to the regime, at least before 1939.

The DAF and KdF's most ambitious program was the "people's car," the Volkswagen, originally a project undertaken at Hitler's request by the car-maker Ferdinand Porsche. When the German car industry was unable to meet Hitler's demand that the Volkswagen be sold at 1,000 ℛ︁ℳ︁ or less, the project was taken over by the DAF. This brought Ley's old socialist tendencies back into prominence. The party, he said, had taken over where private industry had failed, because of the "short-sightedness, malevolence, profiteering and stupidity" of the business class. Now working for the DAF, Porsche built a new Volkswagen factory at Fallersleben, at a huge cost which was partly met by raiding the DAF's accumulated assets and misappropriating the dues paid by DAF members. The Volkswagen was sold to German workers on an installment plan, and the first models appeared in February 1939. The outbreak of war, however, meant that none of the 340,000 workers who paid for a car ever received one.

== Wartime role ==
Ley said in a speech in 1939: "We National Socialists have monopolized all resources and all our energies during the past seven years so as to be able to be equipped for the supreme effort of battle." (→ German rearmament) After the beginning of World War II in September 1939, Ley's importance declined. The militarisation of the workforce and the diversion of resources to the war greatly reduced the role of the DAF, and the KdF was largely curtailed. Ley's drunkenness and erratic behaviour were less tolerated in wartime, and he was supplanted by Armaments Minister Fritz Todt and his successor Albert Speer as the czar of the German workforce (the head of the Organisation Todt (OT)). As German workers were increasingly conscripted, foreign workers, first "guest workers" from France and later slave labourers from Poland, Ukraine and other eastern countries, were brought in to replace them. Ley played some role in this program, but was overshadowed by Fritz Sauckel, General Plenipotentiary for the Distribution of Labour (Generalbevollmächtigter für den Arbeitseinsatz) from March 1942.

Nevertheless, Ley was deeply implicated in the mistreatment of foreign slave workers. In October 1942 he attended a meeting in Essen with Paul Pleiger (head of the giant Hermann Göring Works industrial combine) and leaders of the German coal industry. A verbatim account of the meeting was kept by one of the managers. A recent historian writes:

The key item on the agenda was the question of 'how to treat the Russians.'... Robert Ley, as usual, was drunk. And when Ley got drunk he was prone to speak his mind. With so much at stake, there was no room for compassion or civility. No degree of coercion was too much, and Ley expected the mine managers to back up their foremen in meting out the necessary discipline. As Ley put it: 'When a Russian pig has to be beaten, it would be the ordinary German worker who would have to do it.'

Despite his failings, Ley retained Hitler's favour; until the last months of the war he was part of Hitler's inner circle along with Martin Bormann and Joseph Goebbels. In November 1940 he was given a new role, as Reich Commissioner for Social Housing Construction (Reichskommissar für den sozialen Wohnungsbau), later shortened to Reich Housing Commissioner (Reichswohnungskommissar). Here his job was to prepare for the effects on German housing of the expected Allied air attacks on German cities, which began to increase in intensity from 1941 onwards. In this role he became a key ally of Armaments Minister Albert Speer, who recognised that German workers must be adequately housed if productivity was to be maintained. As the air war against Germany increased from 1943, "dehousing" German workers became an objective of the Allied area bombing campaign, and Ley's organisation was increasingly unable to cope with the resulting housing crisis.

He was aware in general terms of the Nazi regime's programme of extermination of the Jews of Europe. Ley encouraged it through the virulent anti-Semitism of his publications and speeches. In February 1941 he was present at a meeting along with Speer, Bormann and Field Marshal Wilhelm Keitel at which Hitler had set out his views on the "Jewish question" at some length, making it clear that he intended the "disappearance" of the Jews one way or another. According to American historian Jeffrey Herf, Ley issued some of the most overt propaganda accusing Jews of plotting the extermination of Germans and threatening to do the reverse. In December 1939, he said that in the event of a British victory:

... the German people, man, woman, and child would be exterminated [ausgerottet]... The Jew would be wading in blood. Funeral pyres would be built on which the Jews would burn us... we want to prevent this. Hence it should be rather the Jews who fry, rather they who should burn, they who should starve, they who should be exterminated.

In April 1945, Ley became enamored with the idea of creating a "death ray" after receiving a letter from an unnamed inventor: "I've studied the documentation; there's no doubt about it. This will be the decisive weapon!" Once Ley gave Speer a list of materials, including a particular model circuit breaker, Speer found that the circuit breaker had not been manufactured in 40 years.

== Postwar: arrest and suicide ==
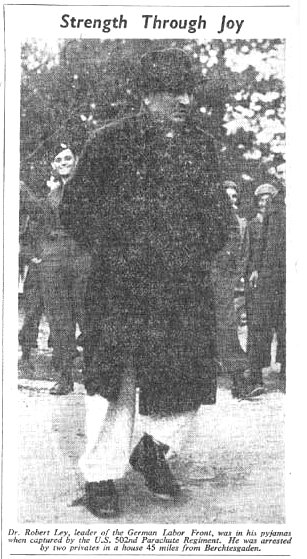
Ley is arrested in his pyjamas by US paratroopers in May 1945.

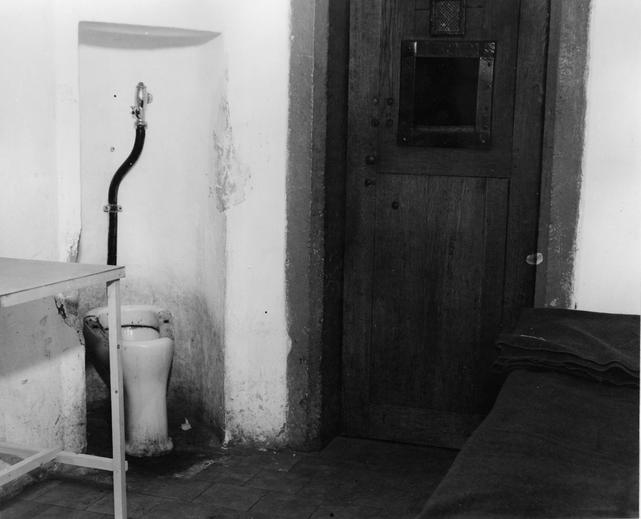
The cell where Robert Ley hanged himself

As Nazi Germany collapsed in early 1945, Ley was among the government figures who remained fanatically loyal to Hitler. He last saw Hitler on 20 April 1945, Hitler's birthday, in the Führerbunker in central Berlin. The next day he left for southern Bavaria, in the expectation that Hitler would make his last stand in the "National Redoubt" in the alpine areas. When Hitler refused to leave Berlin, Ley was effectively unemployed.

On 16 May he was captured by American paratroopers of the 101st Airborne Division in a shoemaker's house in the village of Schleching. Ley told them he was "Dr Ernst Distelmeyer", but he was identified by Franz Xaver Schwarz, the treasurer of the Nazi Party and a long-time enemy. After his arrest, he declared: "You can torture or beat me or impale me on a stake. But I will never doubt the greater deeds of Hitler."

At the Nuremberg trials, Ley was indicted under Count One ("The Common Plan or Conspiracy to wage an aggressive war in violation of international law or treaties"), Count Three (War Crimes, including among other things "mistreatment of prisoners of war or civilian populations") and Count Four ("Crimes Against Humanity – murder, extermination, enslavement of civilian populations, persecution on the basis of racial, religious or political grounds"). Ley was apparently indignant at being regarded as a war criminal, telling the American psychiatrist Douglas Kelley and psychologist Gustave Gilbert who had seen and tested him in prison: "Stand us against a wall and shoot us, well and good, you are victors. But why should I be brought before a Tribunal like a c-c-c- ... I can't even get the word out!"

On 24 October, three days after receiving the indictment, Ley strangled himself to death in his prison cell using a noose made by tearing a towel into strips, fastened to the toilet pipe. The Chief Medical Office of the Military Tribunal, Lt. Col Rene Juchli, made a report to Major General William J. Donovan regarding the effect the suicide had on other prisoners, stating "It appears to be the unanimous consensus of opinion among the witnesses that no bereavement was indicated over the self-inflicted death of the late Dr. Ley." Ley was the first, and one of only two of the 22 high-ranking Nazi leaders at Nuremberg to commit suicide, Hermann Göring being the other.

Psychiatrist Douglas Kelley believed that Ley's erratic behavior was likely a result of organic brain damage, perhaps from his 1917 airplane crash. Kelley sent Ley's brain back to Washington, D.C. to be examined and the examination reported a "long-standing degenerative process of the frontal lobe", which seemed to corroborate Kelley's belief. However, a second examination two years later produced no clear findings.

== See also ==
- Glossary of Nazi Germany
- List of Nazi Party leaders and officials
- List of people who died by suicide by hanging
