= National Socialist Factory Cell Organization =

Nazi German workers organization

- Nationalsozialistische Betriebszellenorganisation
- Successor: German Labour Front
- Founded: 1928
- Dissolved: May 1935
- Members: 300,000 (1932)
- Leader: Walter Schuhmann
- Affiliations: Nazi Party

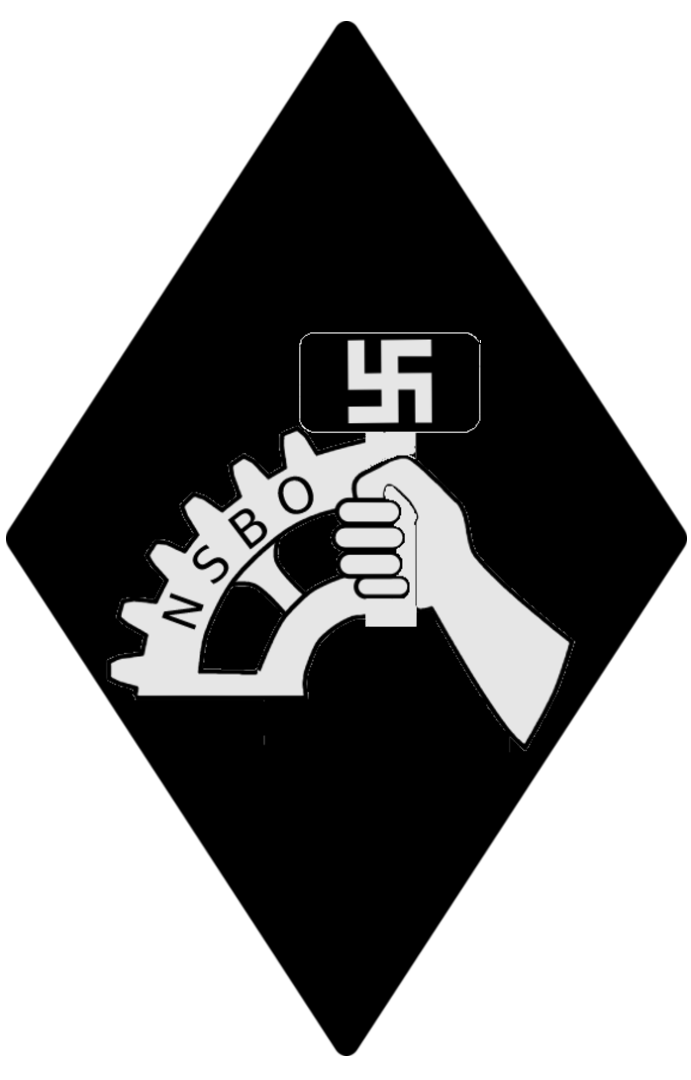
NSBO sleeve insignia

The National Socialist Factory Cell Organization (German: Nationalsozialistische Betriebszellenorganisation, NSBO or NSBZO) was a workers organization in Nazi Germany.

In 1927, some NSDAP workers in large factories, located mostly in the Berlin area, joined as an alternative to social democratic and Christian labor unions. The NSBO was established in 1928 by these groups.

On 15 January 1931, the NSBO was declared the "Reichsbetriebszellenabteilung" (Reich Factory Cell Department) within the Nazi Party Reichsleitung (National Leadership) and was placed under the leadership of Walter Schuhmann. At this time it had only 3,000 members. It began to increase its membership by means of aggressive campaigns, which included both propaganda and violence, under the war-cry: "Hinein in die Betriebe!" (Into the Factories!), which was shortened to "Hib".

The NSBO had overall little success among German organized workers, except in certain regions where they supported strikes, such as the 1932 Berlin transport strike. As a result of the "Hib" campaign, the NSBO increased its membership to only about 300,000 by the end of 1932, while the Democratic and Christian labor unions had still well over 5 million members.

Some sections of the NSBO had an ideology similar to National Bolshevism. They believed that after the "national revolution" occurred, a "social revolution" had to follow, to do away with the existing elites. This attitude earned them sympathies in some places, like in Nordhorn, a textile industrial city in the county of Bentheim, where the NSBO defeated the formerly strong Communist labor unions in the industrial worker council elections in 1933. The NSBO's methods then included using armed violence in order to offset a salary reduction in a particular factory.

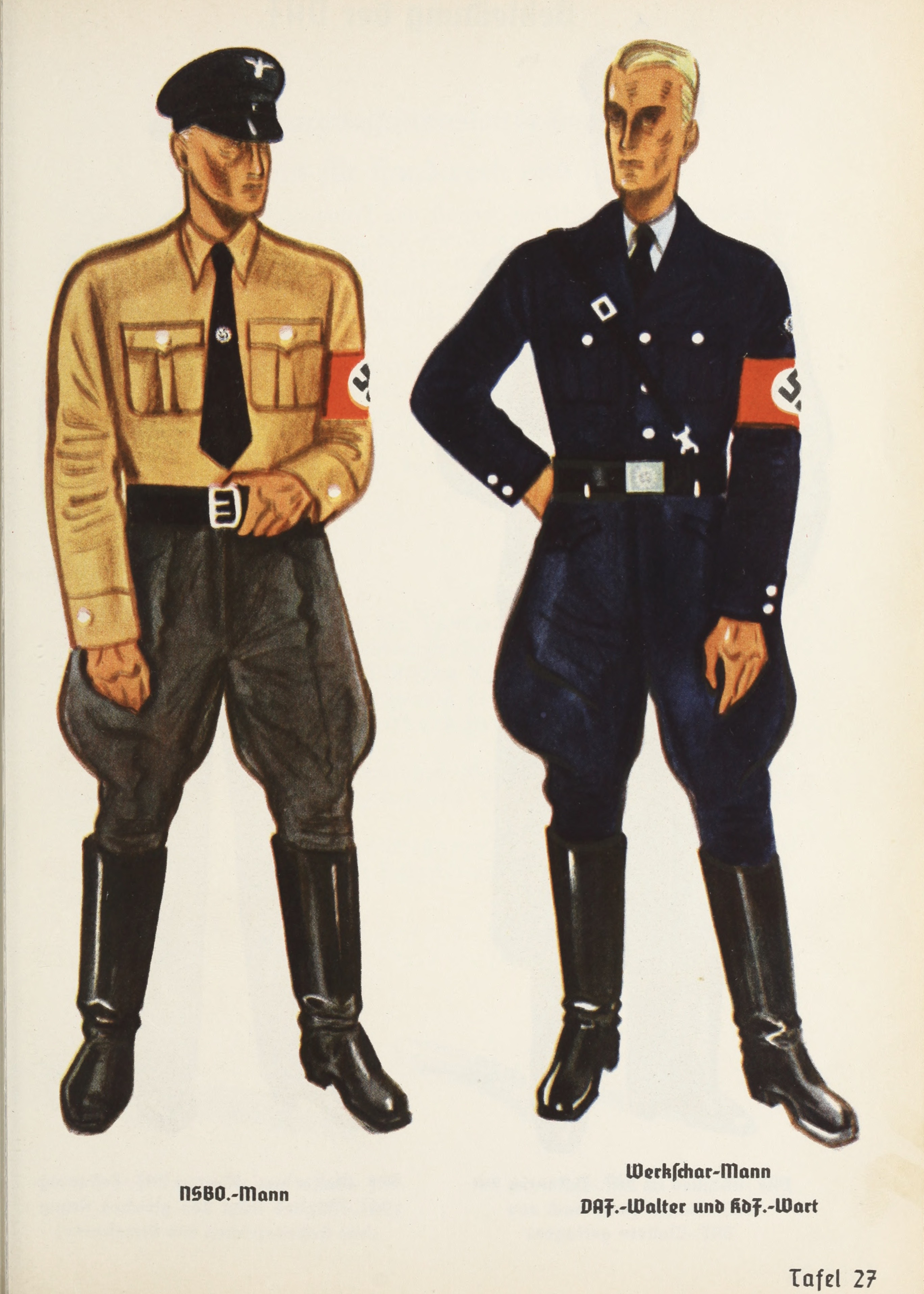
Uniforms for the National Socialist Factory Cell Organization and the German Labour Front, 1936.

After all non-Nazi trade unions were outlawed by decree on 2 May 1933, the NSBO became the only official workers' organization in Germany. This moment of glory, however, was short, for the German Labour Front (DAF) was established a few days later. More organized and better represented at national level, the DAF ended up absorbing the NSBO in 1935.
