= German Labour Front =

Labour organization in Nazi Germany

- Deutsche Arbeitsfront
- Abbreviation: DAF
- Predecessor: National Socialist Factory Cell Organization
- Formation: 10 May 1933; 93 years ago
- Dissolved: 8 May 1945; 81 years ago
- Legal status: Illegal
- Members: 32 million (1938)
- Leader of the DAF: Robert Ley
- Parent organization: NSDAP
- Subsidiaries: National Socialist Trade and Industry Organization; Beauty of Labour; Strength through Joy

The German Labour Front (German: Deutsche Arbeitsfront, pronounced [ˌdɔʏtʃə ˈʔaʁbaɪtsfʁɔnt]; DAF) was the national labour organization of the Nazi Party, which replaced the various independent trade unions in Germany during the process of Gleichschaltung or Nazification.

== History ==
As early as March 1933, two months after Adolf Hitler was appointed Chancellor, the Sturmabteilung began to attack trade union offices without legal consequences. Several union offices were occupied, their furnishings were destroyed, their documents were stolen or burned, and union members were beaten, thrown out of windows and in some cases killed outright; the police ignored these attacks and declared itself without jurisdiction. These early attacks occurred at random, carried out spontaneously by rank-and-file Nazis motivated by a desire to destroy Marxism, and the Nazi Party leadership only implemented a general policy in May. On 2 May 1933, trade union headquarters throughout Germany were occupied, their funds were confiscated, and the unions were officially abolished and their leaders brutally beaten and arrested. Many union leaders were sent to concentration camps, including some who had previously agreed to cooperate with the Nazis.

The German Labour Front (DAF) was then created in May 1933 as the organization that was to take over the assets seized from the former trade unions. Robert Ley, who had no previous experience in labour relations, was appointed by Hitler to lead the DAF upon its creation. Three weeks later, Hitler issued a decree that banned collective bargaining and stated that a group of labour trustees, appointed by him, would "regulate labour contracts" and maintain "labour peace". This decree effectively outlawed strikes, since workers could not oppose the decisions of the trustees. Meanwhile, Robert Ley promised "to restore absolute leadership to the natural leader of a factory—that is, the employer ... Only the employer can decide."

The leadership of the DAF stressed that there was no need for antagonism between workers and employers in the new Nazi state. To underline this, its laws were couched in a neo-feudal language of reciprocity. This new system of industrial relations represented a major victory for the employers, backed by the Nazi leadership, who needed the co-operation of industry in their drive to rearm.

Unlike the trade unions it had replaced, the DAF did not aim to be an organization representing the interests of workers alone; it also included employers and members of the professions, and defined itself as "the organization of creative Germans of brain and fist". The law establishing the DAF stated that its aim was not to protect workers but "to create a true social and productive community of all Germans [and] to see that every single individual should be able to perform the maximum of work." The labour trustees, who had the power to set wages, in practice followed the wishes of employers and did not even consult the workers. There was also a mandate from Hitler to keep wages low, as he declared that the hourly wage should remain the same and workers should be able to earn more only through increased productivity. Although Germany experienced an economic recovery throughout the 1930s and employment greatly increased, wages remained as low as they had been during the Great Depression, and sometimes even lower.

The DAF also gave employers the ability to prevent their workers from seeking different jobs. In February 1935, the "workbook" (Arbeitsbuch) system was introduced, which issued every worker with a workbook that recorded his skills and past employment. These workbooks were required for employment and they were kept by the employer; if a worker desired to quit his job, the employer could refuse to release his workbook, preventing the worker from being legally employed anywhere else.

To compensate for these restrictions on wages and employment, the DAF sought to provide workers with leisure and entertainment. Robert Ley explained his policy as aiming to "divert the attention of the masses from material to moral values", as he believed it "more important to feed the souls of men than their stomachs". Thus, the DAF established the Strength Through Joy organisation, which provided factory libraries and concerts, swimming pools, adult education programmes, variety performances, theatre visits, athletic events, subsidized tickets to the opera, and subsidised vacations with a focus on cruises. The number of people taking holiday cruises went from 2.3 million in 1934 to 10.3 million in 1938.

The DAF financed the building of ocean-going vessels that permitted German workers to pay minimal prices to sail to many foreign destinations. Up to six ocean liners were operating just before the start of World War II. According to the chief of the Associated Press in Berlin, Louis P. Lochner, ticket prices for ocean steamer vessels ranged from twelve to sixteen marks for "a full week on such a steamer". For those who desired vacations closer to home, the DAF constructed spa and summer resort complexes. The most ambitious was the 4.5 km long Prora complex on Rugen island, which was to have 20,000 beds, and would have been the largest beach resort in the world. It was never completed and the massive complex largely remained an empty shell right through until the 21st century.

The DAF was one of the largest Nazi organizations, boasting of over 35,000 full-time employees by 1939. It operated one of the largest financial institutions—the Bank of German Labour—as well as various workplace programmes such as medical screening, occupational training, legal assistance and the Beauty of Labour organization. To help Hitler keep his promise to have every German capable of owning an affordable car (Volkswagen—the People's Car) the DAF subsidised the construction of an automobile factory, which was partially paid from workers' payroll deductions. None of the 340,000 workers who were paying for a car ever received one, since the factory was retooled for war production after Nazi Germany invaded Poland.

DAF membership was theoretically voluntary, but any workers in any area of German commerce or industry would have found it hard to get a job without being a member. Furthermore, many unemployed people were drafted into the Labour Front where they were given uniforms and tools and put to work; the disappearance of unemployed people from the streets contributed to the perception that the Nazis were improving the economic conditions of Germany. Membership required a fee within the range of 15 Rpf. to 3 ℛ︁ℳ︁, depending on the category a member fell into, on a large scale of twenty membership groups. A substantially large amount of income was raised through fees. In 1934, the total DAF revenue from fees was 300,000,000 ℛ︁ℳ︁. In US dollars, the annual income from dues to the Labour Front came to $160,000,000 in 1937 and $200,000,000 by 1939.

== Organization ==
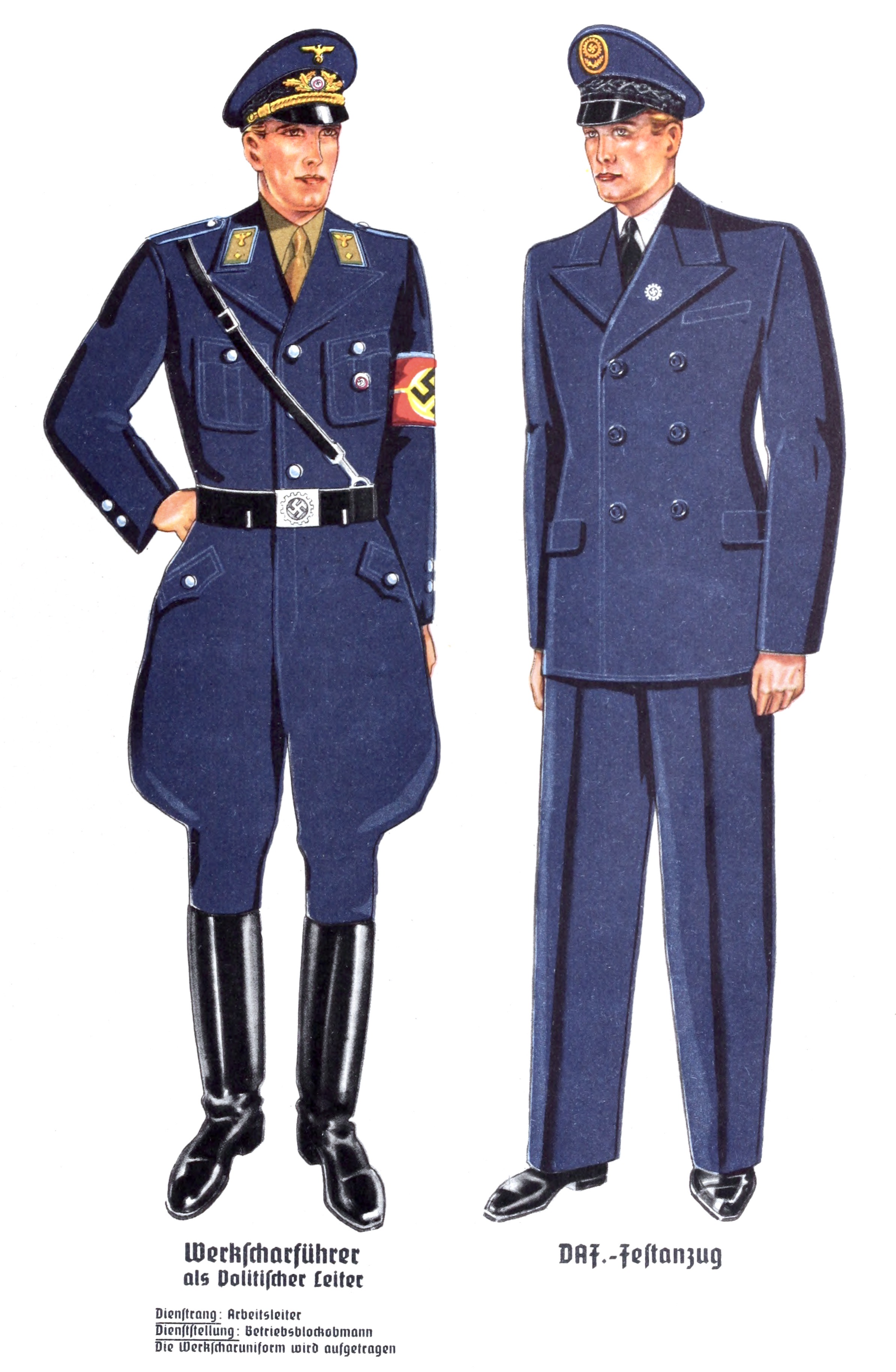
Uniforms for leaders of the German Labour Front, 1943

There were two main components of the DAF:

- Nationalsozialistische Betriebszellenorganisation (NSBO; National Socialist Factory Cell Organization)
- Nationalsozialistische Handels- und Gewerbeorganisation (NSHAGO; National Socialist Trade and Industry Organization)

Several other sub-organizations were set up, including:

- Kraft durch Freude (KdF; Strength through Joy) – Organization giving the workers cheap/free holidays in addition to subsidised sporting and leisure facilities.
- Schönheit der Arbeit (SdA; Beauty of Labour) – Aimed to make workplaces more enticing to workers (e.g., renovations of outdated factories, new canteens for workers, smoking-free rooms, cleaner working spaces etc.).

The Front also organised the Reichsberufswettkampf, a national vocational competition.

== See also ==
- Arbeitsfront der Volksdeutschen in der Slowakei (Labour Front of the Volksdeutsche in Slovakia)
- Class collaboration
- Corporatism
- National syndicalism
