= Adolf Hitler Schools =

Schools run by the SS from 1937 to 1945

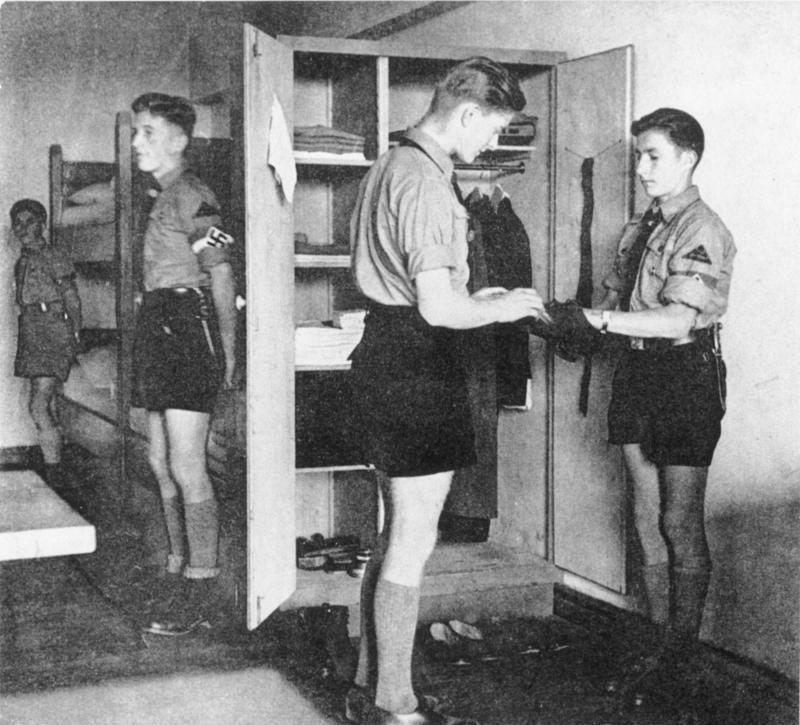

Location
- Germany

District information
- Type: Boarding schools
- Established: 1937
- Closed: 1945
- Governing agency: SS
- Schools: 12

Students and staff
- Students: 2,027

Adolf Hitler Schools (German: Adolf-Hitler-Schulen, AHS) were 12 day schools run by the Schutzstaffel in Nazi Germany from 1937 to 1945. Their aim was to indoctrinate young people into the ideologies of the Nazi Party. They were for young people aged 14 to 18 years old and were single sex, with three schools for girls and the rest for boys. Selection for admission to the schools was rigorous; pupils were chosen for their political dedication and physical fitness, as opposed to their academic prowess. Activities focused on political indoctrination rather than academic studies. The SS often selected future officers from the schools.

The AHS should not be confused with numerous schools renamed "Adolf Hitler School" after Hitler became the Chancellor of Germany in 1933, such as the former Martin Luther School in Marburg, the Werner Heisenberg High School in Heide, the Nordstadt School in Pforzheim, the Paul Werner High School in Cottbus, or the Goethe School in Flensburg.

There was also a similar network of boarding schools called the National Political Institutes of Education ("Napolas").

== Context ==
The founding was based on plans laid out by Hitler Youth leader Baldur von Schirach and politician Robert Ley. It was Ley's intention to erect a "Gauburg" (citadel) in every Gau, and subsequently create an entire NSDAP school system, transforming the state-supported National-Political Institutes of Education. Resistance to this plan from education minister Bernhard Rust stalled the original project until 1941, when the Adolf Hitler Schools gained the support of the German Labor Front. Until 1941, the schools were collocated with the similarly financed Order Fortresses and oversight for the schools' structure was provided by the Reich Youth Leadership.

At the behest of Reichsführer-SS, Heinrich Himmler, some of the training methods at certain Adolf Hitler Schools were blanketed in secrecy. The AHS were expected to provide an example for the Nazi educational revolution.

== Selection of pupils ==
Only pupils who were pre-selected from the Hitler Youth were admitted. This was followed by a two-week selection process at a camp, where the candidates were evaluated according to specified criteria, standards that included but were not limited to:

- Leadership qualities, like proving that they excelled as leaders among their peers
- Racial purity via an evaluation of their physical attributes and proof of Aryan genealogical ancestry "uncontaminated" by non-Aryan races
- Medical examinations to establish absolute health
- Excelling in competitions designed to test their strength and toughness, like forced marches, war games, gymnastics, boxing, wrestling, and other feats of courage
- Strict observance by Hitler Youth leadership of a candidate's social fitness through contests and their social adaptability during leisure time

== History ==
The first AHS opened on 20 April 1937 (Hitler's forty-eighth birthday) in Pomeranian Krössinsee, and while the Hitler Youth's (HJ) leadership envisioned fifty such schools with in excess of 15,000 students, as late as the end of 1943 only ten schools were operational with a meager 2,027 pupils in attendance. Economic considerations related to the war effort strained the planned budget for the schools. Overall the curriculum at the AHS represented an outright rejection of previous educational ideas since it was anti-traditional, anti-knowledge, anti-Gymnasium, and anti-parent in disposition. While the AHS original educational plan was intended to entirely transform schooling in Nazi Germany, it proved not much more than a duplicate model to the Education Institutes' boarding schools. Hitler Youth leaders and Order Fortress teachers operated as overseers and despite the rigid discipline at the schools, all Hitler Youth ranks addressed one another using the informal/familiar "Du", and instead of regional Gauleiter supervising schools in their respective territories, authority was given to Hitler Youth commanders.

Hitler described the aims of the AHS in the following terms:

We are bringing talented youngsters, the children of the broad mass of our population. Workers' sons, farmers' sons, whose parents could never afford to put their children through higher education [...] Later on, they will join the Party, they will attend the Ordensburg, they will occupy the highest positions. We have a goal which may seem fantastical. We envisage a state in which each post will be held by the ablest sons of our people, regardless of where he comes from. A state in which birth means nothing, but performance and ability mean everything.

Scholarship lagged significantly behind as a criterion for success at these schools, namely since time-honored curricula and teacher qualifications were sacrificed for Nazi commitment. Starting in 1941, the AHS became the "Reich Schools of the NSDAP"; thereafter, several AHS were housed in emptied sanatoriums or other available cloister schools, and strict regional student assignments ceased with German-speaking pupils from Nazi-occupied territories being admitted. Proving oneself as "the best" superseded educational success, but despite this fact, pupils received a diploma and the Education Ministry certified students for university study following matriculation from AHS. Some AHS graduates took up leadership positions in the Children's Country Evacuation, and after 1943, many were assigned as flak helpers. Some portion of the training at the AHS explicitly remained military in nomenclature, designed to prepare the AHS graduates for a future role in the Nazi military apparatus—training that endured until the end of the Third Reich itself.

== See also ==
- Nazi elite schools
