= Ordensburg Vogelsang =

Former Nazi complex

Coordinates: 50°35′04″N 6°26′53″E

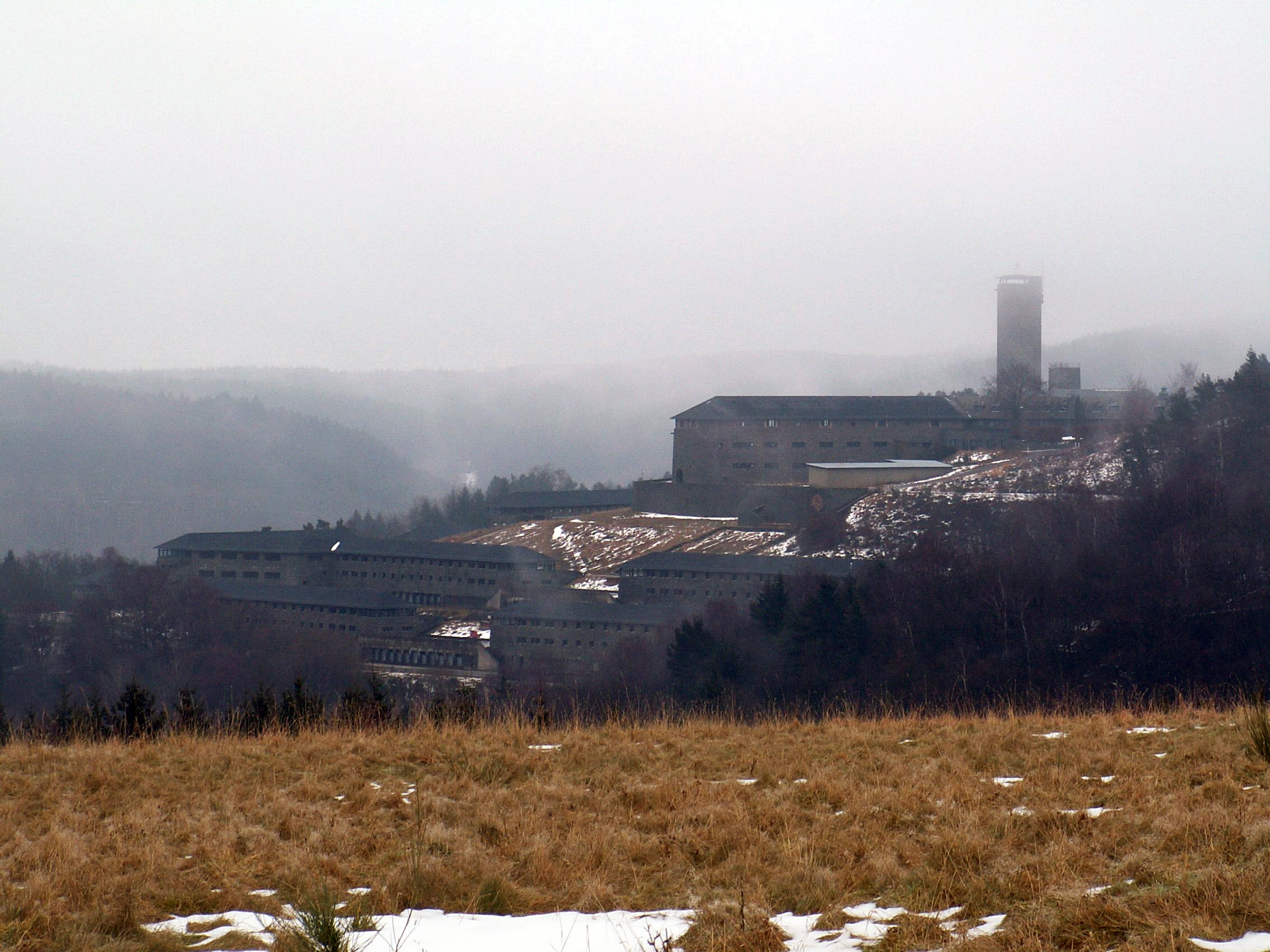
View to the Ordensburg from the former town of Wollseifen

Ordensburg Vogelsang is a former Nazi complex located within the former military training area of Vogelsang in the Eifel National Park in North Rhine-Westphalia.

The landmarked and fully preserved complex was used by the Nazi Party between 1936 and 1939 as an educational centre for future leaders. Since 1 January 2006 the area has been open to visitors. It is one of the largest architectural relics of Nazi Germany. The total area of the listed buildings is 50,000 m^{2}.

== History ==
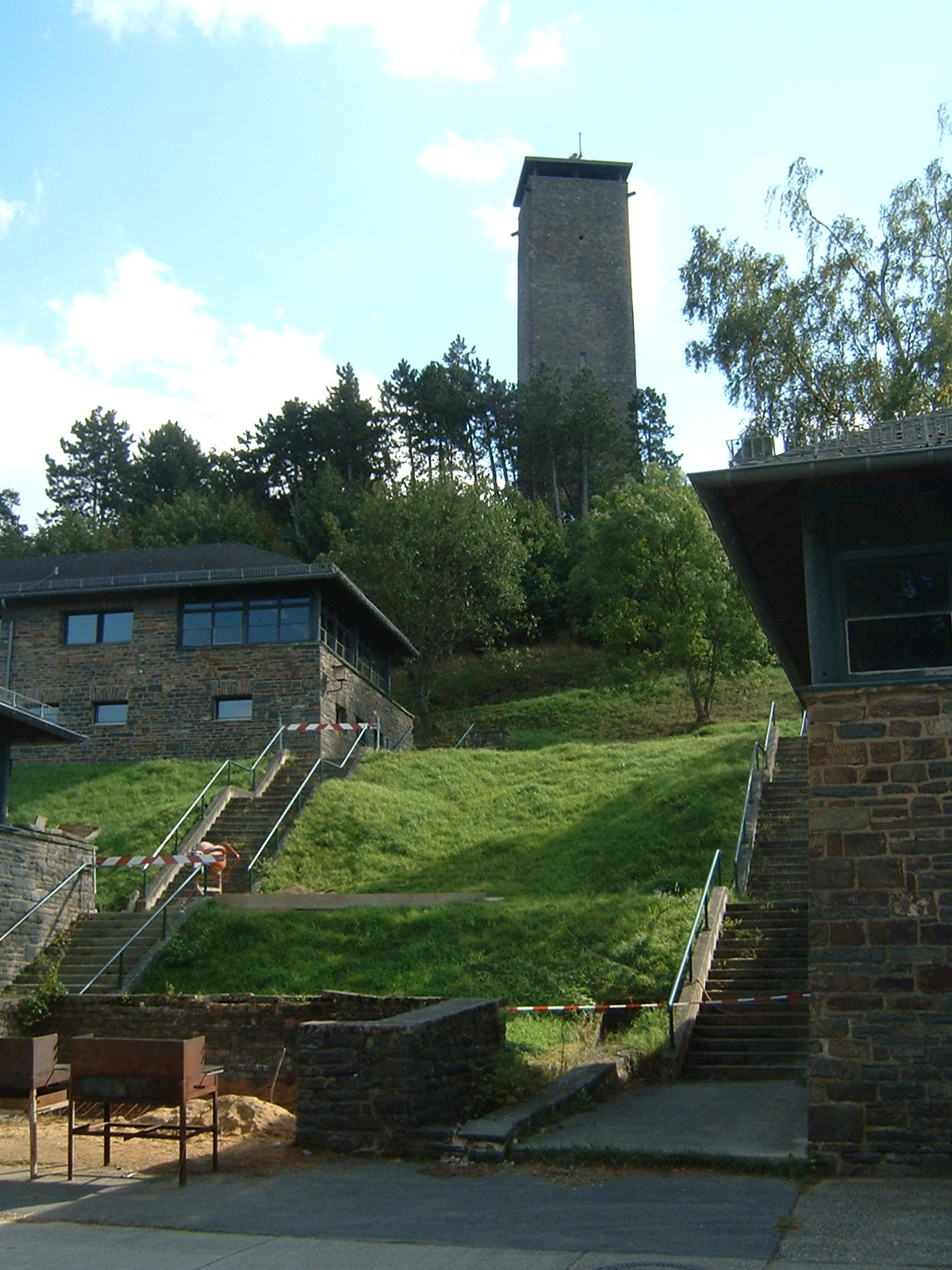
The Watertower of the Ordensburg (48 m height)

=== Planning and construction since 1933 ===
In a 1933 speech in Bernau near Berlin, Adolf Hitler demanded that new schools be built for children of the leaders of the Nazi Party. The task was given to Robert Ley, the "Reichsorganisationsleiter" (literally: Reich Organisational Leader) of the NSDAP, who undertook the construction and operation of four educational camps (NS-Ordensburgen, literally "Castles of the Nazi military order"):

- Ordensburg Krössinsee, in Pomerania
- Ordensburg Sonthofen, in Allgäu
- Ordensburg Vogelsang, in Eifel
- A fourth one was planned at (the historical) Ordensburg Marienburg, in West Prussia.

The construction of Ordensburg Vogelsang, most of which lies within the borough of Schleiden, was financed by expropriating trade unions and employers' associations. The contract for planning the Krössinsee and Vogelsang projects went to Cologne architect, Clemens Klotz.

The three buildings in the Eifel have been known as the "NS-Ordensburg" since 1935. The first phase of the project was the construction of the Vogelsang 'Castle', which with up to 1,500 workers took only two years. Several much bigger buildings were also planned, such as a huge library to be called the "House of Knowledge" (Haus des Wissens) measuring 100 metres by 300 metres, a "Kraft durch Freude" hotel with 2000 beds, and the biggest sports facilities in Europe. Construction at the site halted on the outbreak of war.

Overview of the buildings

- the entry area with gate and two towers (almost completed)
- the "House of Knowledge" (Haus des Wissens) (only the foundation walls completed)
- the "Community House" (Gemeinschaftshaus) with "Adlerhof" (literally translated: "eagle's yard"), tower, east wing and west wing (completed, partly destroyed in the war)
- ten "Kameradschaftshäuser" (literally 'comradeship-houses') for 50 pupils each (completed, partly destroyed in the war)
- four "Hundertschafthäuser" (literally 'houses for one hundred') for 100 pupils each (completed)
- the Thingplatz as event stage (completed)
- sports facilities with tribune, gymnasium and indoor swimming pool (completed)
- the torch bearer (Feuermal Fackelträger) (completed)
- the "House of female employees" (completed)
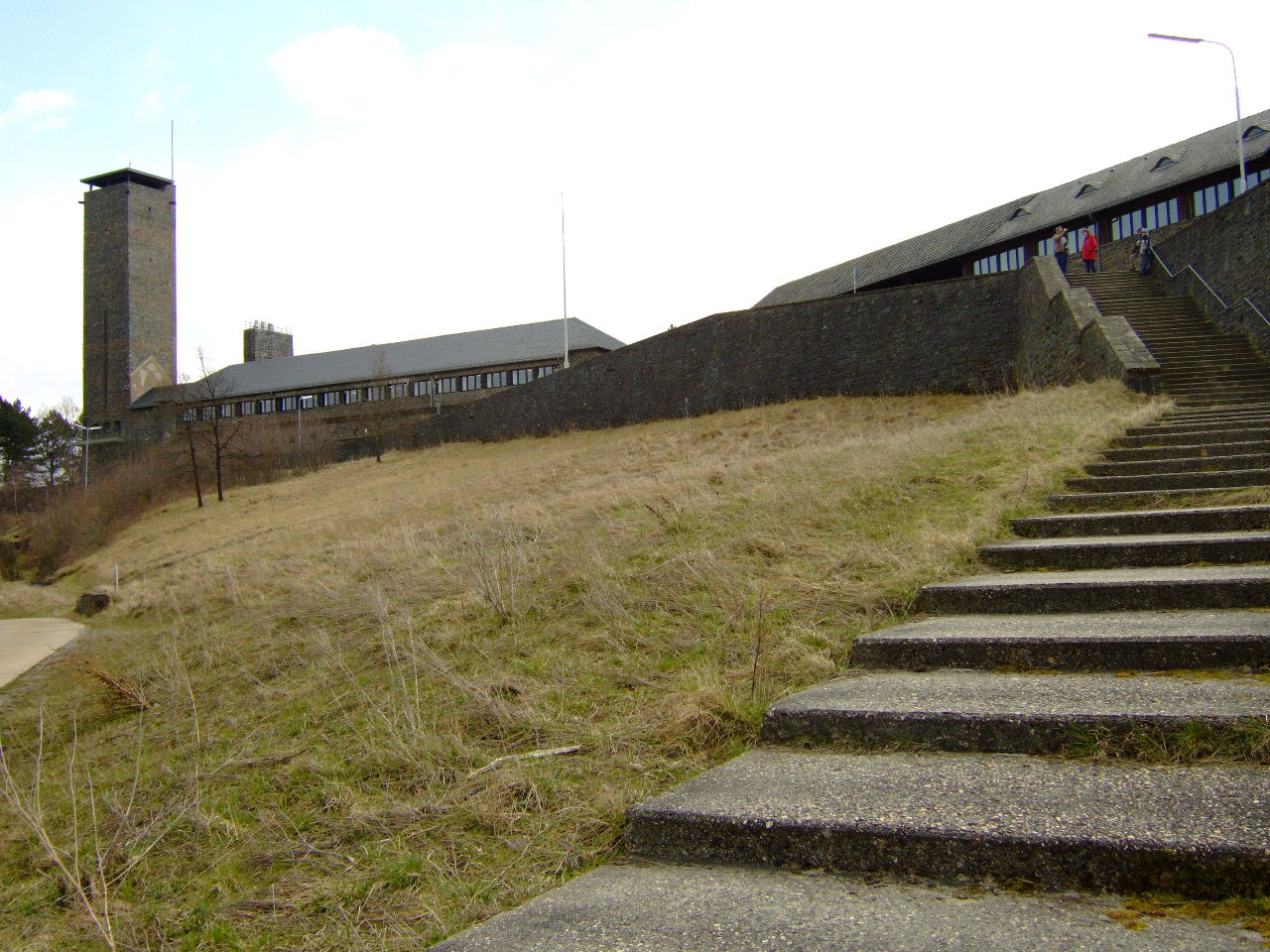
Entrance area of the castle

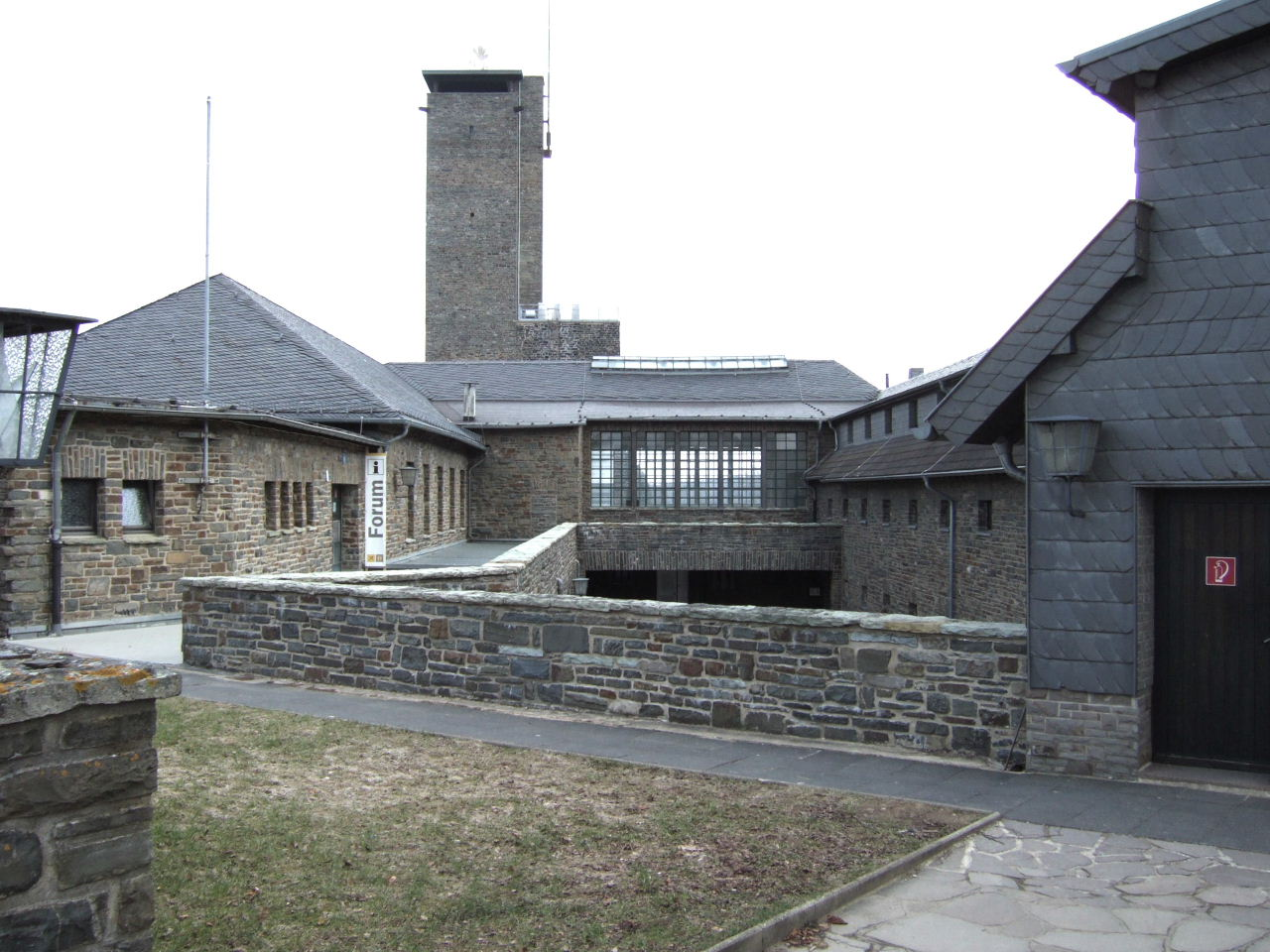
Inner courtyard of the castle

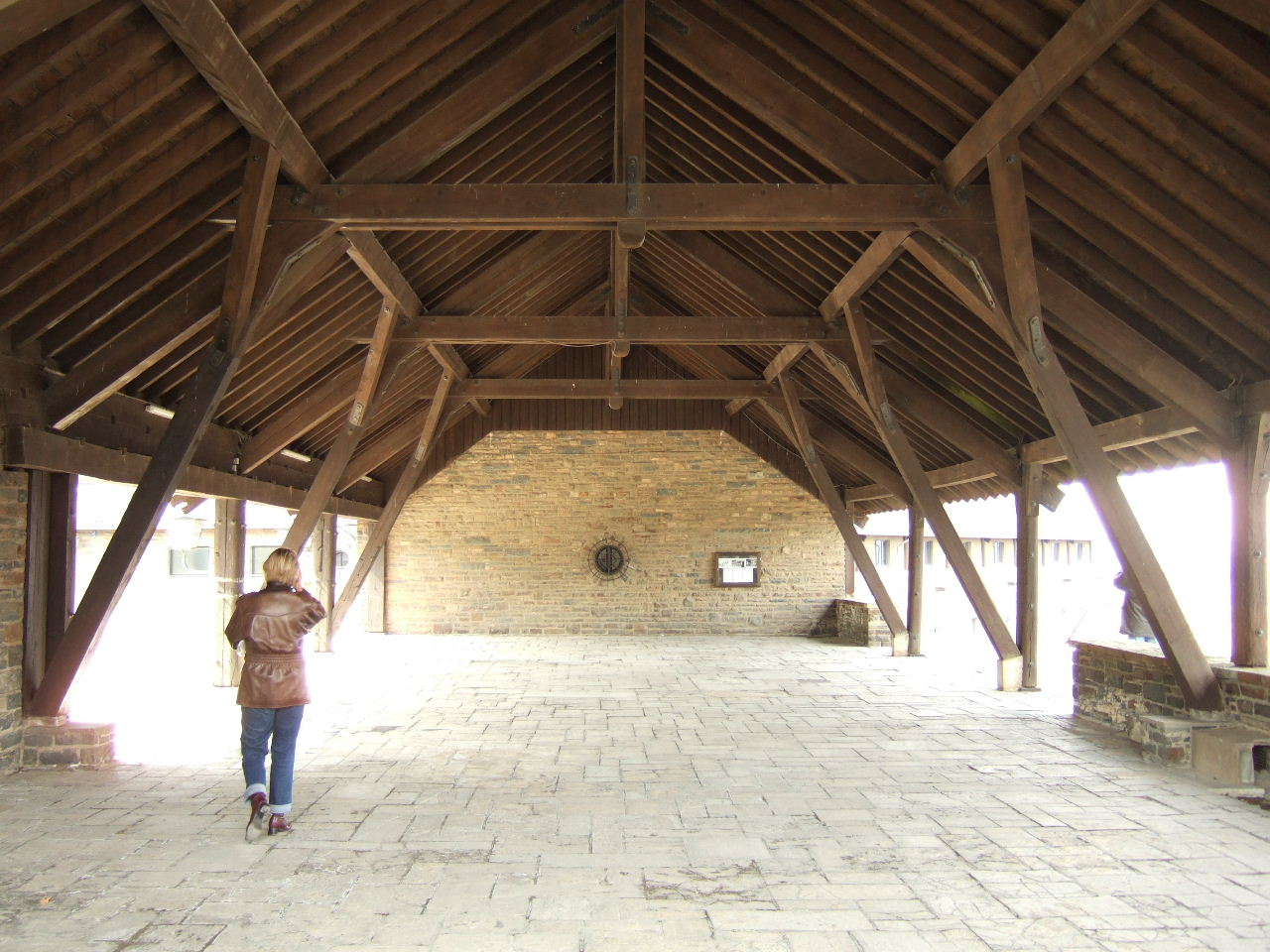
Lobby (Wandelhalle)

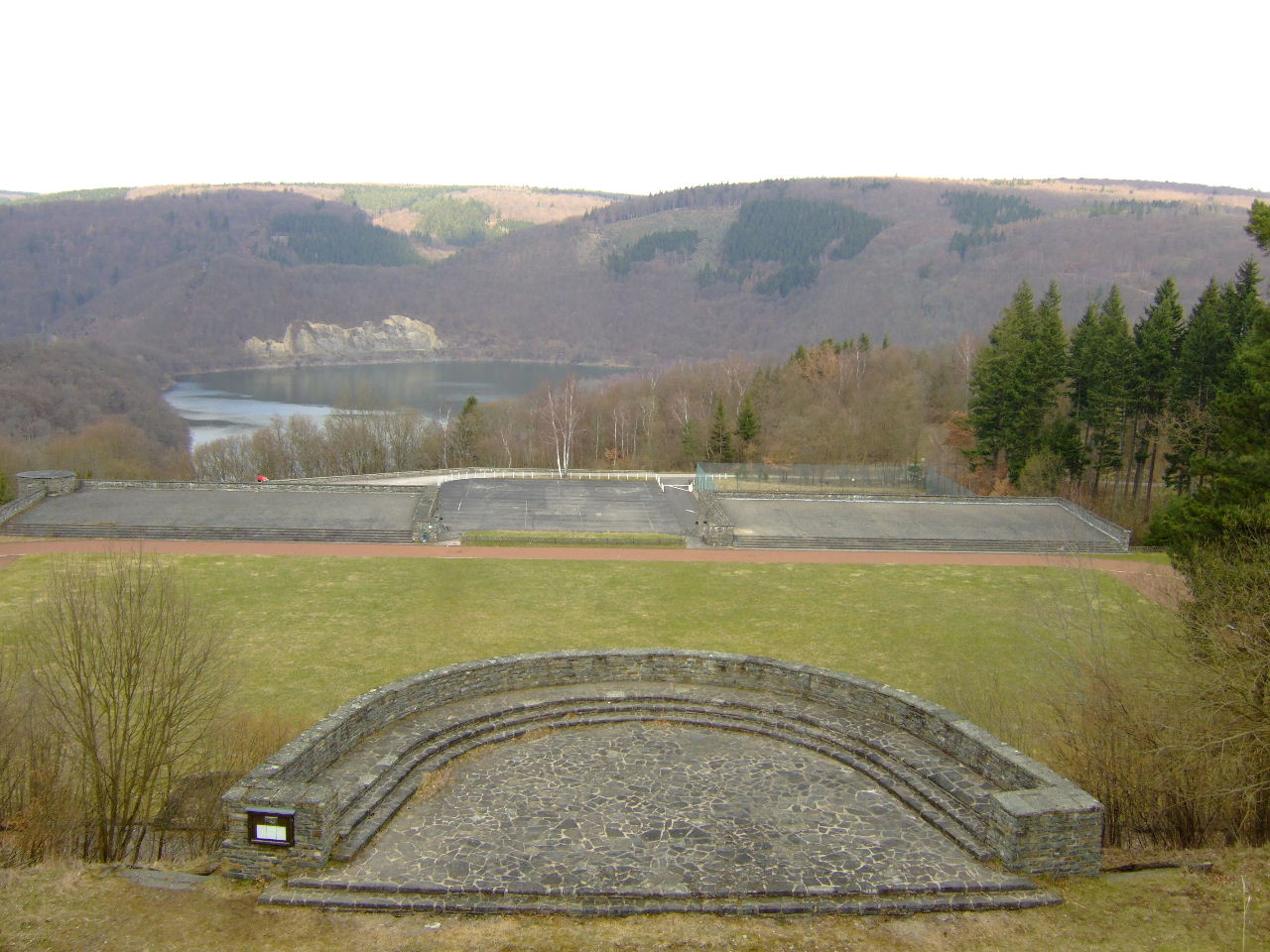
Thingplatz

=== Art ===
Most of the sculptures in Vogelsang - "Fackelträger" (torch bearer), "Der deutsche Mensch" (The German Man), "Adler" (Eagle) and the "Sportlerrelief" (sportsmen-relief) - were created by Willy Meller. The wood-sculpture "Der deutsche Mensch" disappeared in 1945. The other sculptures have been preserved, but are partly damaged.

After a visit by Adolf Hitler in 1937, Doric pillars without any static function were added to the entrance gate. According to reports, the initiative for that came from Hitler himself.

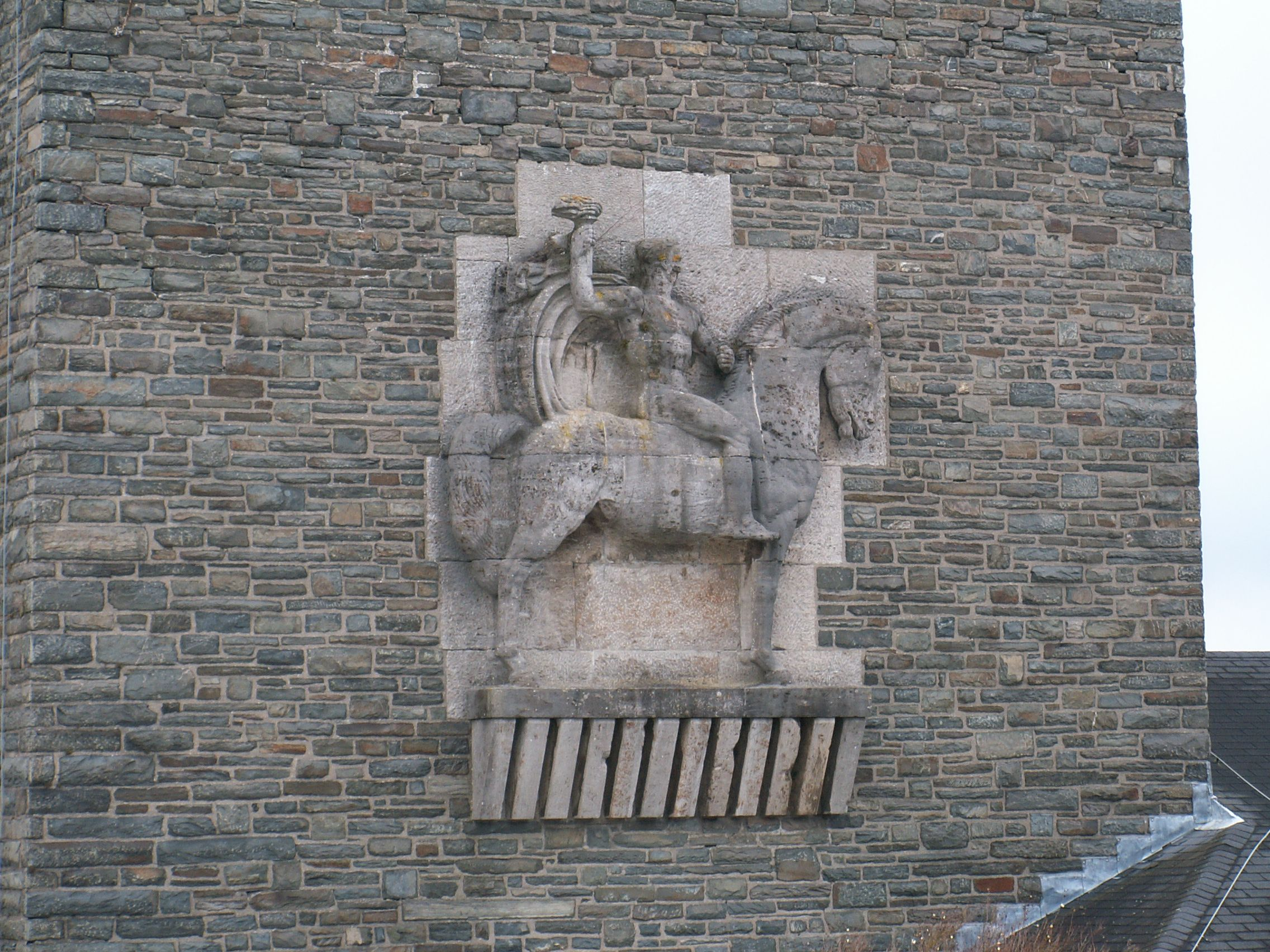
Willy Meller: equestrian relief at the main gate

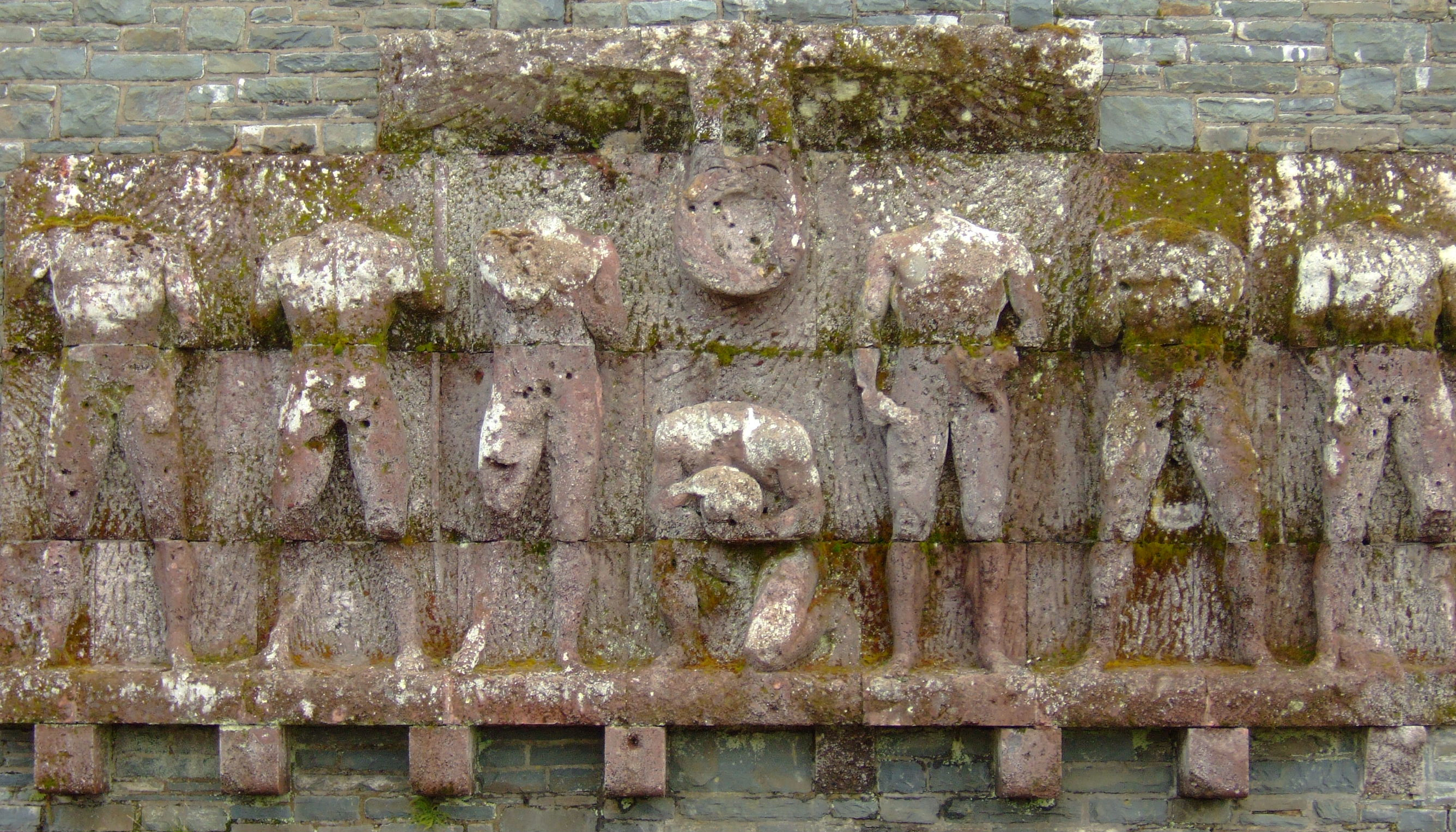
Willy Meller: Sportlerrelief (sportsmen-relief)

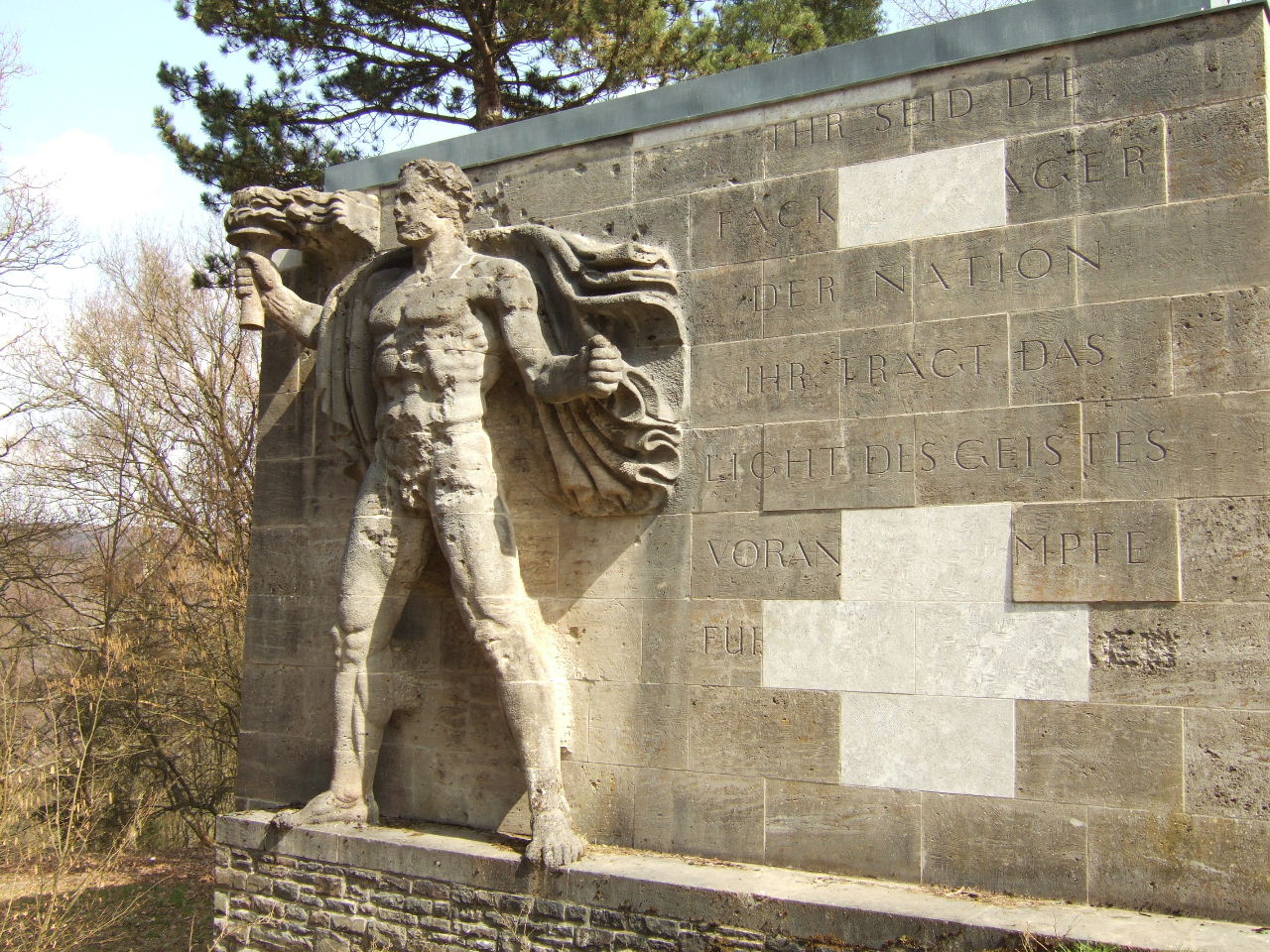
Willy Meller: Fackelträger (torch bearer) at the Sonnenwendplatz (solstice place)

Inscription: You are the torch bearers of the nation; You carry on the light of the spirit in the fight for (Adolf Hitler (unreadable))

=== Educational Castle of the NSDAP since 1936 ===
On 24 April 1936, the three Ordensburgen were formally handed over to Adolf Hitler, and the first 500 Orden Junkers (cadets) moved into Vogelsang a little later, arriving from all over Germany. Most were in their mid twenties, and entrance requirements included a period of probationary party work, perfect physical health, proof of descent, and proof of work and military service.

The daily timetable

- 6:00 early morning exercise
- 7:00 muster
- 8:00 - 10:00 project groups
- 10:00 - 12:00 lecture in the big auditorium
- afternoons sport
- 17:00 - 18:30 project groups
- 22:00 rest

Emphases were placed on Nazi racial theories, geopolitics and intensive sports education (especially equitation). Another emphasis was pilot training, and airfields were built at all three Ordensburgen to accommodate this phase of the curriculum. The Vogelsang Airfield was built near Walberhof, near the town of Schleiden-Morsbach.

The Vogelsang Ordensburg was also used as a showplace for political notables.

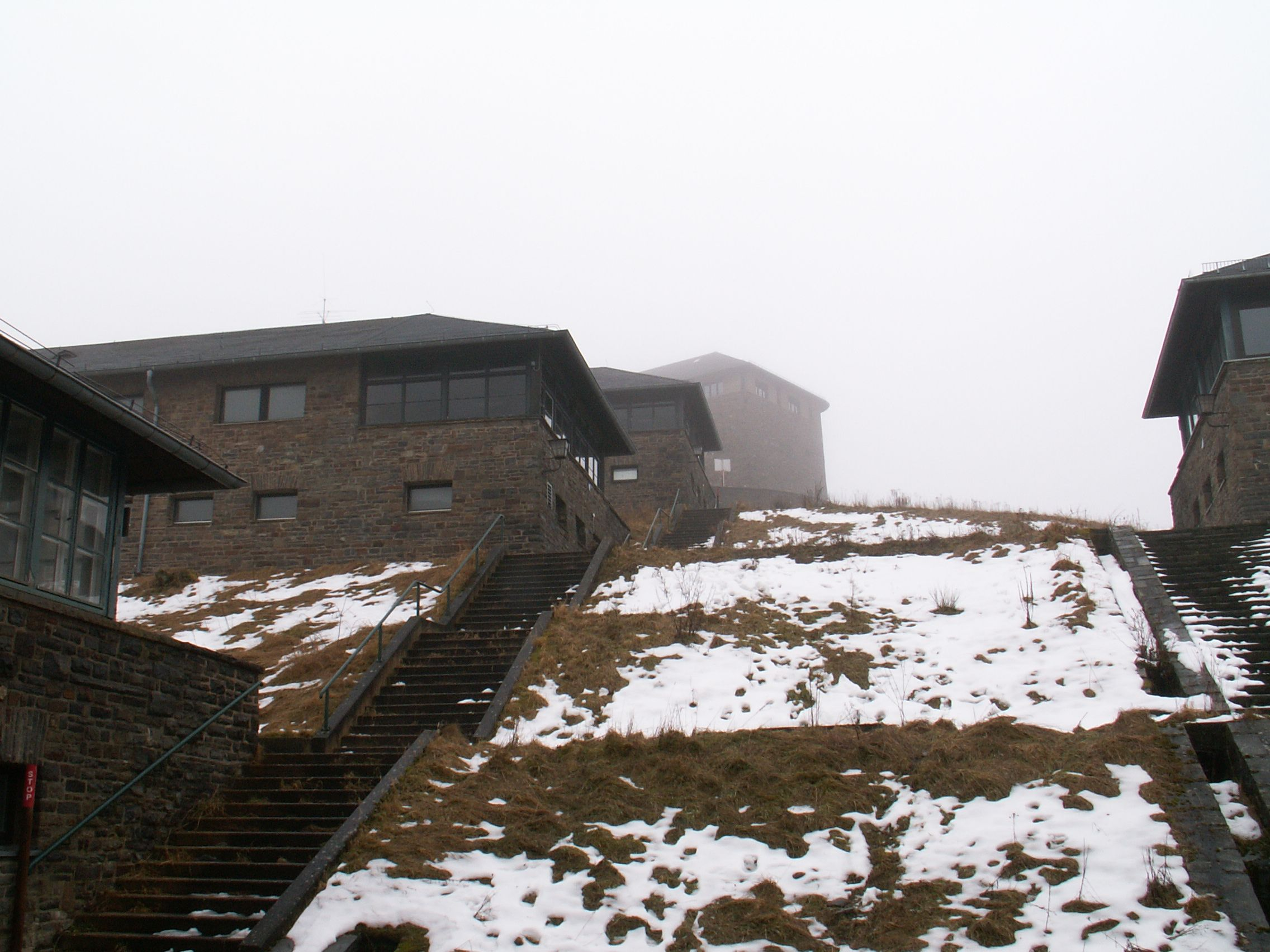
Comradeship-houses (Kameradschaftshäuser) (for one hundred)

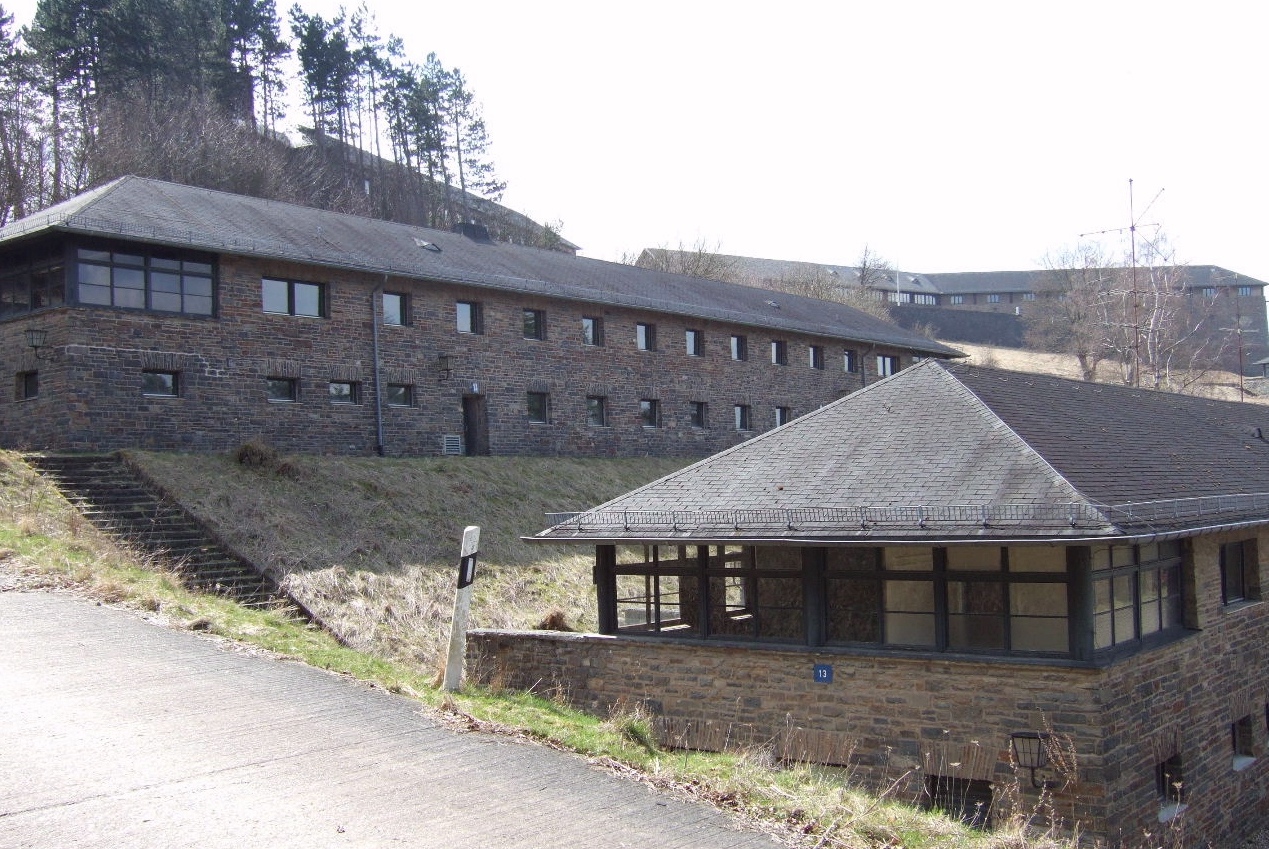
Comradeship-houses

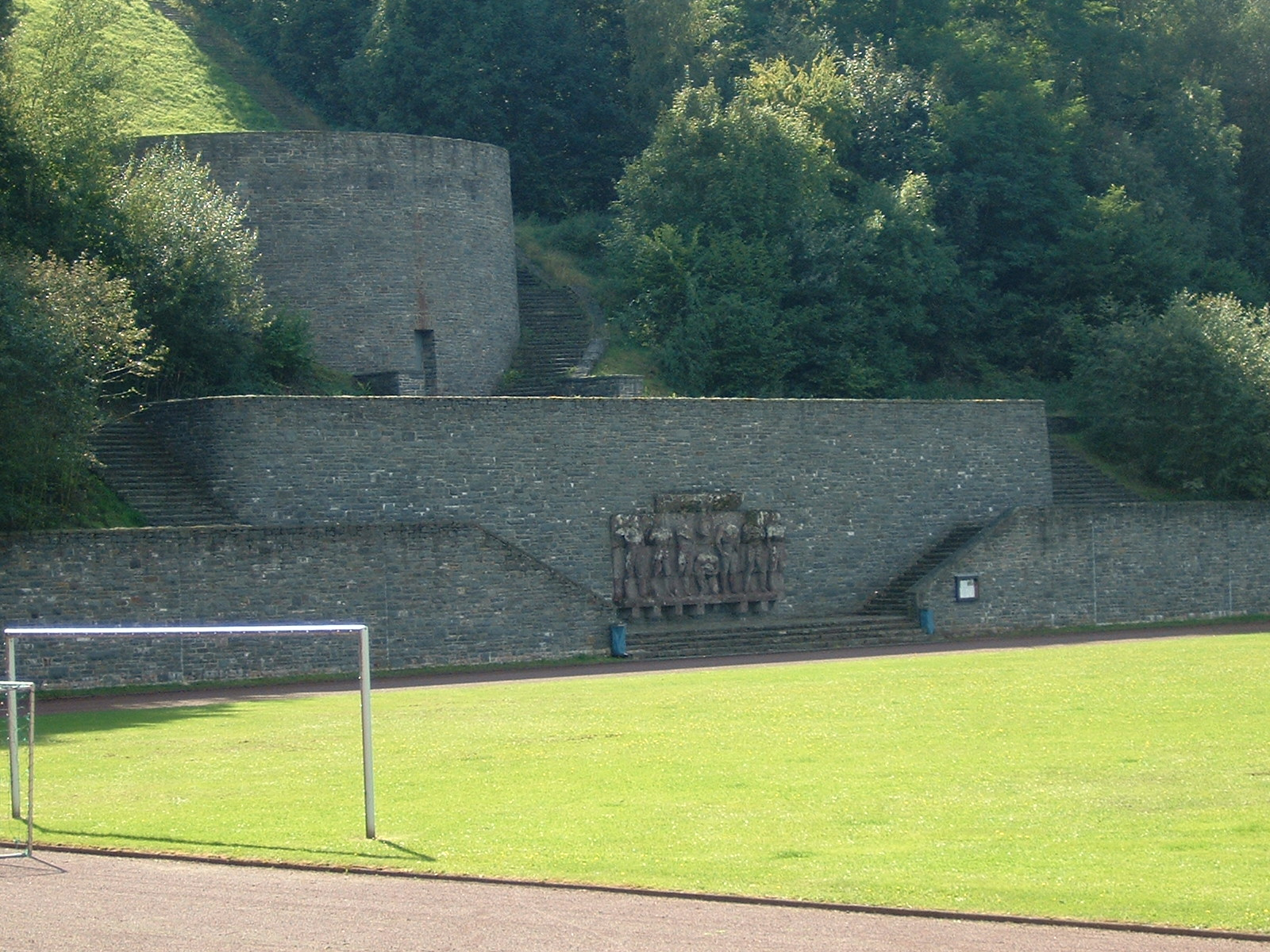
Sports field with sportsmen-relief

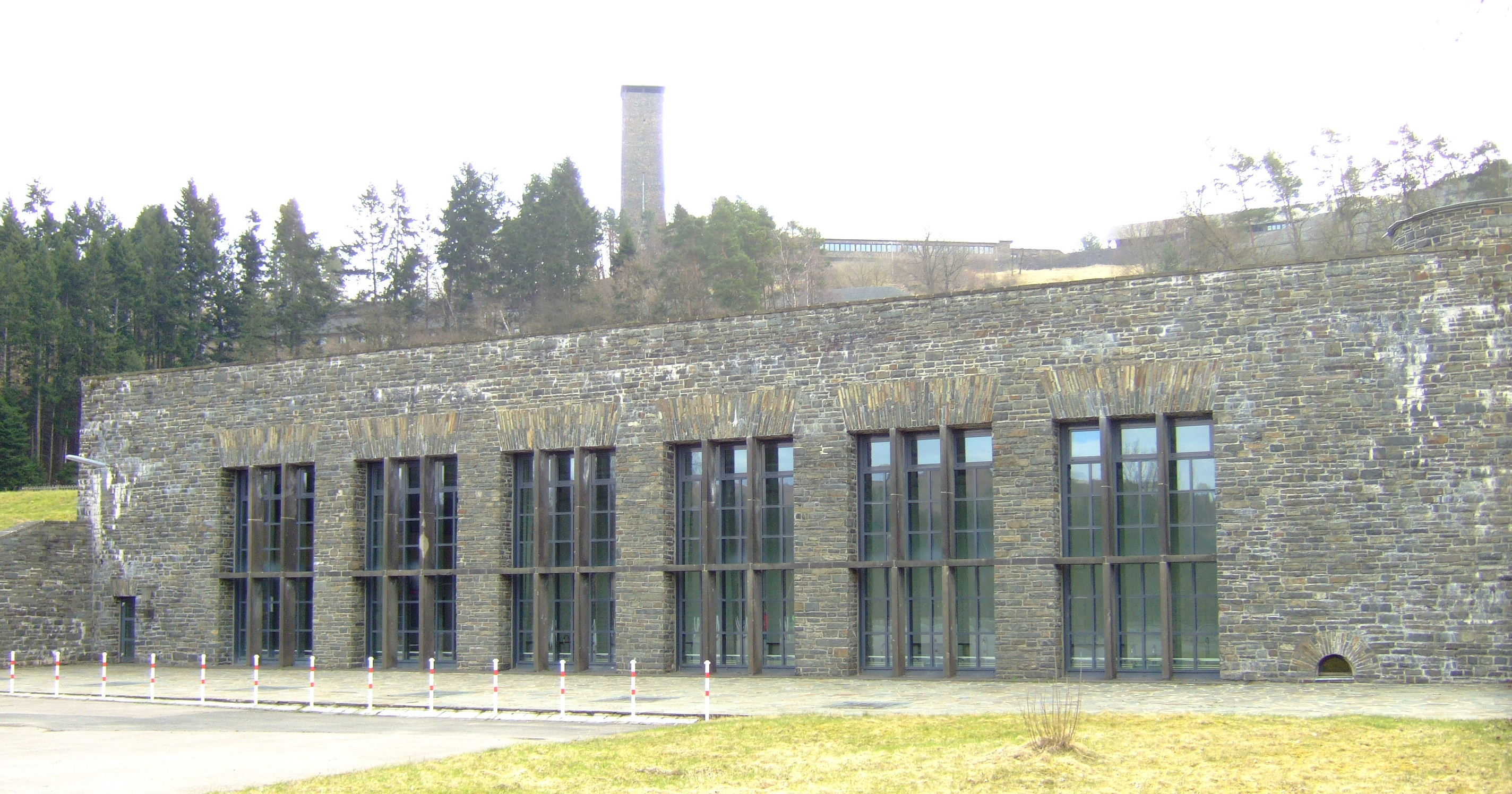
Gymnasium

=== 1939-1945 ===
At the outbreak of the war in September 1939, the Orden Junkers departed and the Castle of Vogelsang was handed over to the German army (Deutsche Wehrmacht), which used it twice for billeting troops: in 1940 during the western campaign, and in December 1944 during the Ardennes offensive.

During the interim, Vogelsang hosted a couple of classes of the so-called Adolf-Hitler-Schools. In 1944, a military fitness camp for 15- and 16-year-old members of the Hitler Youth (Hitler-Jugend) was held there. Allied air raids destroyed some of the buildings, including the east wing and the gymnasium.

=== Use as a military training area since 1946 ===
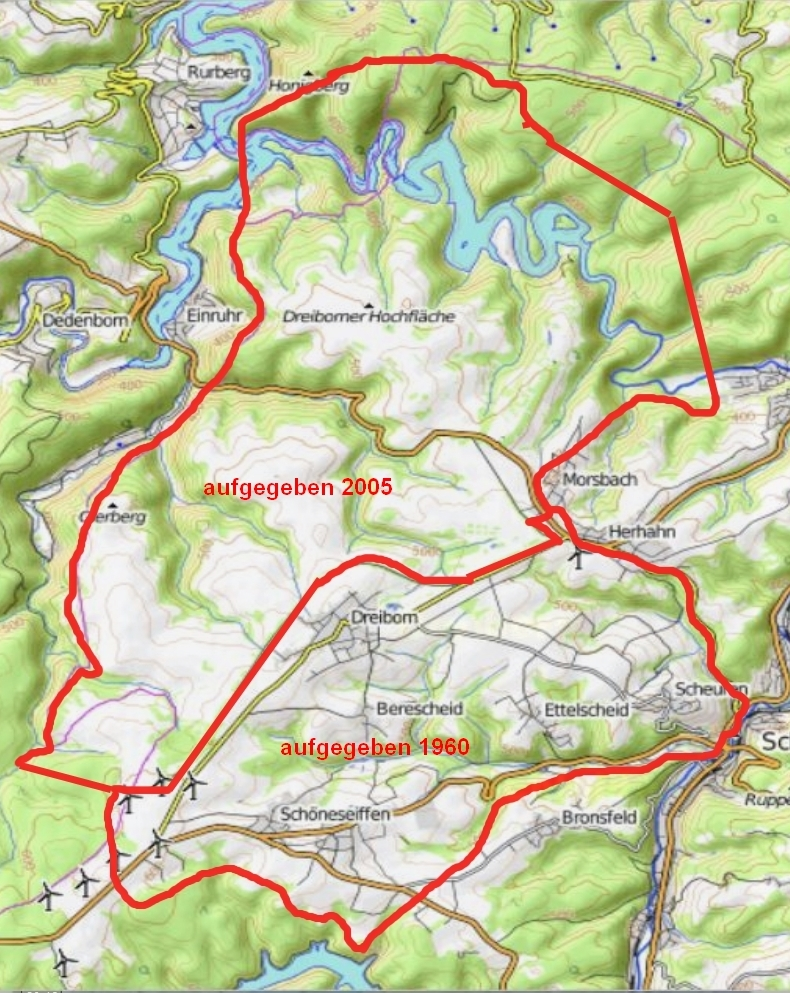
Vogelsang Military Training Area

The buildings destroyed during the war were reconstructed by the Belgian military authorities, and the surviving structures—reduced to bare brickwork—acquired a practical use. The foundation walls constructed for the House of Knowledge (Haus des Wissens) were used for the Van Dooren barrack block, and the adjacent basement, originally intended for an auditorium, became a cinema. This cinema has room for an audience of over 200. Of the decorations, only the emblems of the Third Reich—the swastikas—were removed.

=== Civil use since 2006 ===
After its period as a military training area came to an end, the former Ordensburg has been open to civilians since 1 January 2006. It can be visited during daytime. The surrounding area is used for hiking trails. The complex will eventually accommodate the administration of the National Park Eifel, the visitor centre, and an exhibition in the Castle. The "Van Dooren" barracks block will be demolished soon because the accommodations are no longer needed. The cinema and all the other buildings still exist.

In 2016 the German government said it would use some of the Vogelsang Barracks blocks to house migrant refugee claimants.

The latest stage of a £40 million facelift is the opening of an exhibition, aiming to educate the young against fascism. The display depicts how ordinary men and women were conditioned by the Nazis to hate Jews and others branded as inferiors.

== Literature ==
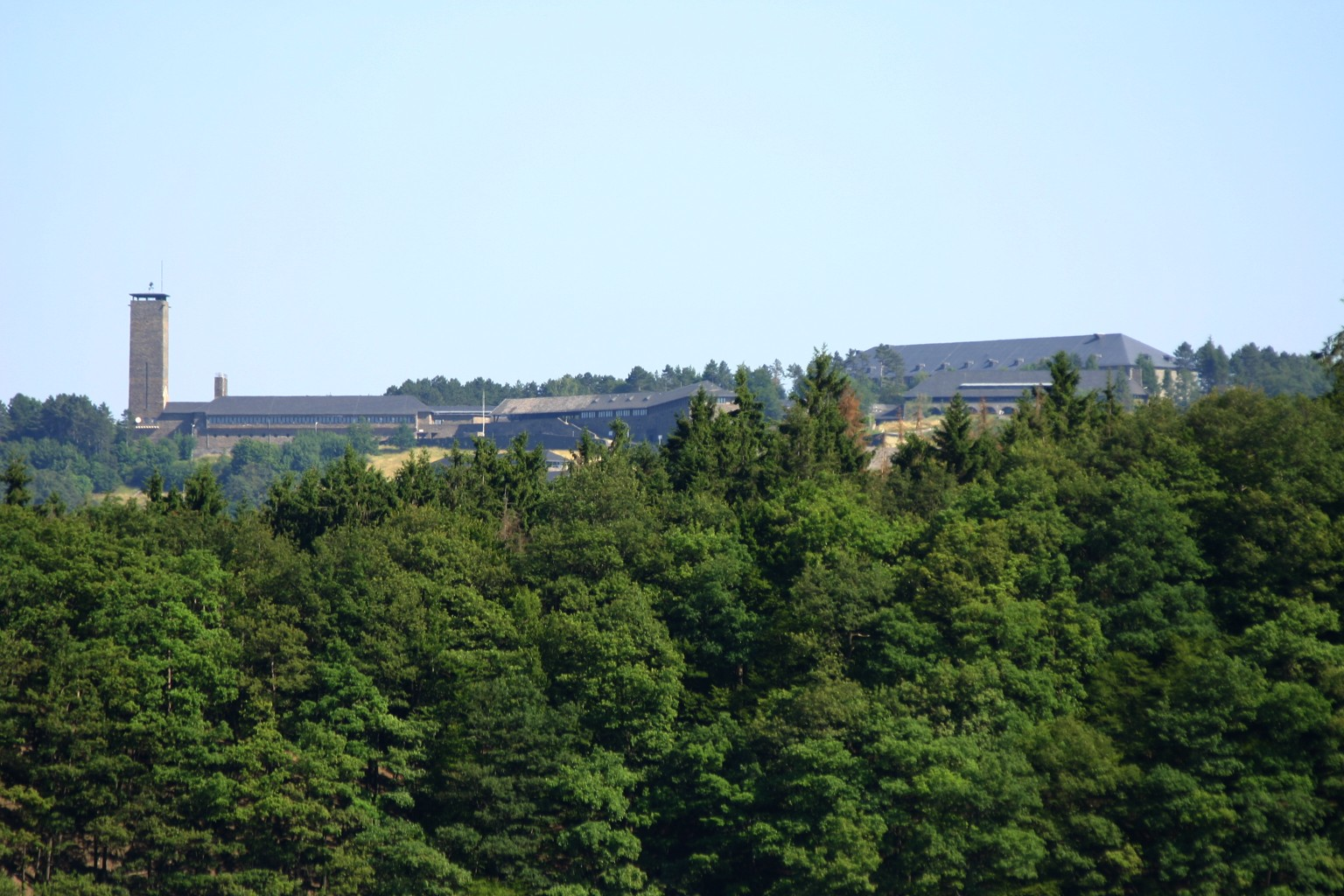
View from the Urfttal dam

- Schmitz-Ehmke, Ruth: Die Ordensburg Vogelsang: Architektur – Bauplastik – Ausstattung. (Landschaftsverband Rheinland - Landeskonservator Rheinland. Arbeitsheft 41) Rheinland-Verlag, Köln. 2003. (2. veränd. und erw. Auflage)
- Arntz, Hans-Dieter: Vogelsang - Geschichte der ehemaligen Ordensburg, Helios-Verlag, Aachen 2008, ISBN 978-3-938208-71-7
- Arntz, Hans-Dieter: Ordensburg Vogelsang... im Wandel der Zeiten. Helios-Verlag, Aachen 2007, 64 S., ISBN 978-3-938208-51-9
- Arntz, Hans-Dieter: Ordensburg Vogelsang 1934 – 1945, Beitrag zum Deutschland Archiv – Drittes Reich (Dokumente), Archiv Verlag Braunschweig 2009.
- Arntz, Hans-Dieter: Ordensburg Vogelsang 1934 bis 1945 – Erziehung zur politischen Führung im Dritten Reich. Verlag Landpresse Weilerswist, 6. Auflage, Helios Verlag Aachen 2010, ISBN 978-3-86933-018-1
- Heinen, Franz A.: Vogelsang - Von der NS-Ordensburg zum Truppenübungsplatz in der Eifel. Eine kritische Dokumentation. Helios-Verlag, Aachen. 2005. (3. Auflage) ISBN 3-933608-46-5
- Heinen, Franz A.: Vogelsang. Im Herzen des Nationalparks Eifel. Ein Begleitheft durch die ehemalige "NS-Ordensburg". Gaasterland Verlag. Düsseldorf. 2006. ISBN 3-935873-11-5. 48 S.
- Herzog, Monika: Architekturführer Vogelsang. Ein Rundgang durch die historische Anlage im Nationalpark Eifel. Edition B, Köln 2007. ISBN 978-3-9807179-0-8.
- Kuffner, Alexander: Zeitreiseführer. Eifel 1933–1945. Helios-Verlag, Aachen 2007, ISBN 978-3-938208-42-7.
