= Ordensburg Sonthofen =

Coordinates: 47.506°N 10.286°E

Generaloberst-Beck-Kaserne
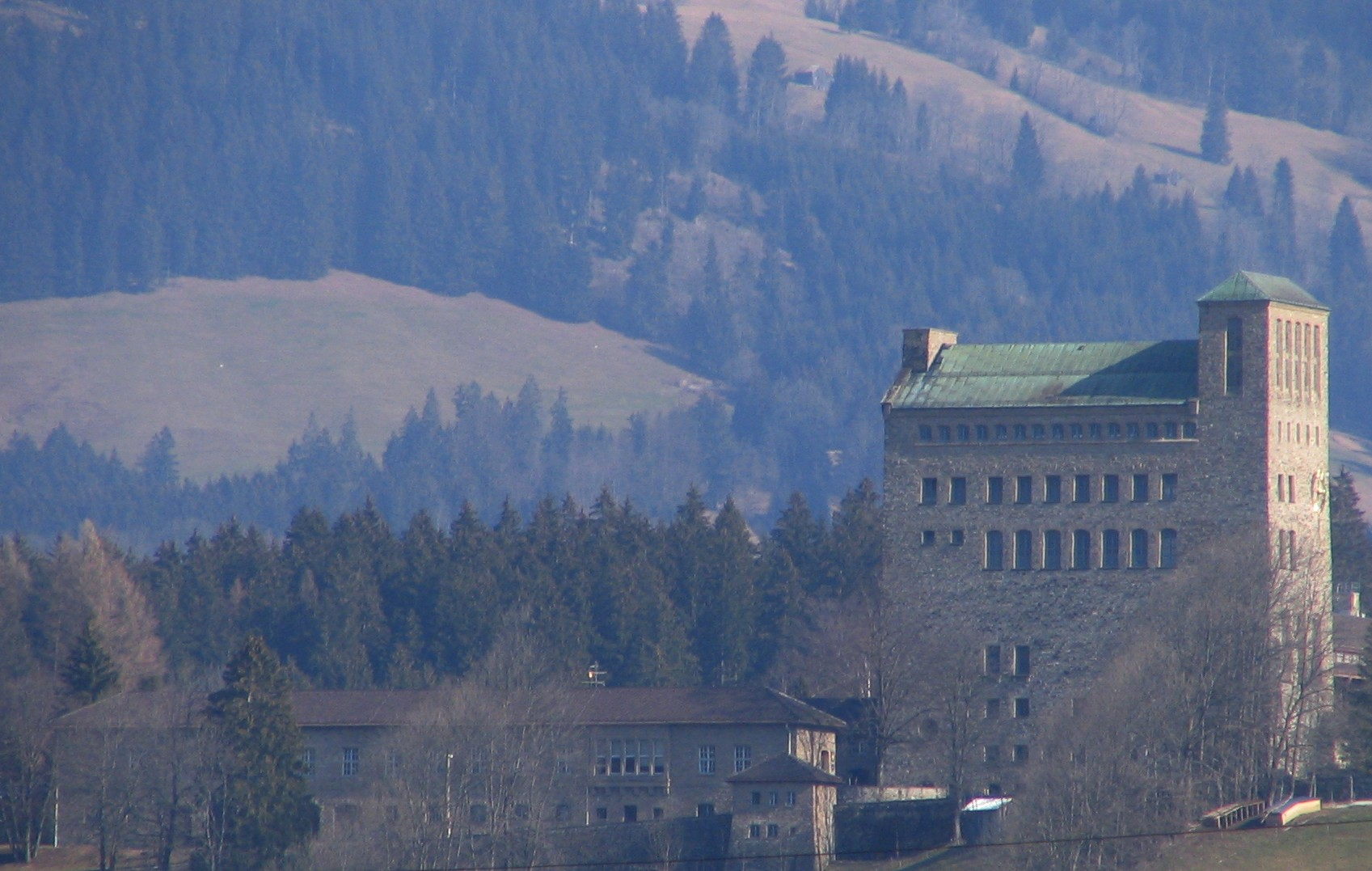
- Exterior view (2007)
- Interactive map of the Generaloberst-Beck-Kaserne area
- Former names: NS-Ordensburg Sonthofen

General information
- Status: Completed
- Type: Military Barracks
- Architectural style: Neoclassicism
- Location: Sonthofen, Oberallgäu
- Completed: 1934
- Owner: Bundeswehr

The Ordensburg Sonthofen is one of the NS-Ordensburgen built during the Third Reich in Sonthofen (Oberallgäu). Currently it belongs to the Bundeswehr and is named Generaloberst-Beck-Kaserne.

== History ==
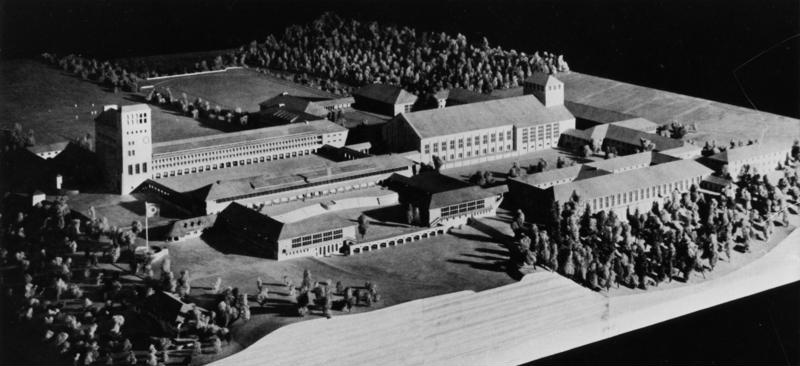
Model of a previously planned version of Ordensburg Sonthofen.

The complex was built in 1934 as NS-Ordensburg Sonthofen by the German Labour Front (Deutsche Arbeitsfront, DAF in short) for the NSDAP.

Three NS-Ordensburgen existed:

- Ordensburg Krössinsee, Pomerania
- Ordensburg Sonthofen, Allgäu
- Ordensburg Vogelsang, Eifel

A fourth one (Ordensburg Marienburg) was planned at the historic Castle of the Teutonic Order in Malbork, in East Prussia (currently Poland).

It was designed by architect Hermann Giesler as a school for the education of elite Nazi military and party echelons. The internationally known actor Hardy Krüger attended this school. In the last year of the war it was used as a servicemen's hospital.

Commander of the Ordensburg was, from 1936 to 1941, Robert Bauer, an Old Fighter of the Nazi party and member of the Reichstag since 1933.

After the war French troops first took over the Castle. Later the US Army located the training center for the United States Constabulary force there. From May 1951 through February 1952, was used by the United States Air Force in Europe as a basic training center,

In 1956 the Castle was acquired by the Bundeswehr and was named after the member of resistance and former chief of the general staff of the army Colonel General Ludwig Beck.

== Current use ==
The Generaloberst-Beck-Kaserne hosted schools of the Bundeswehr (Military Police (Feldjäger) and Staff Service). In 2009 the Bundeswehr transferred these schools to the Emmich-Cambrai-Kaserne in Hannover. Two other bases were then closed and their personnel moved to Sonthofen.

Today the facility is protected as a historic site.

== Literature ==
- Hartmut Happel: Die Allgäuer Ordensburg in Sonthofen. Eberl, Immenstadt 1996, ISBN 3-920269-01-2
- Gerhard Klein: Die NS-Ordensburg Sonthofen 1934 bis 1945. In: Paul Ciupke u. Franz-Josef Jelich (Hrsg.): Weltanschauliche Erziehung in Ordensburgen des Nationalsozialismus. Zur Geschichte und Zukunft der Ordensburg Vogelsang Geschichte und Erwachsenenbildung, Bd. 20. Essen 2006. S. 65 - 84
