= Clemens Klotz =

German architect

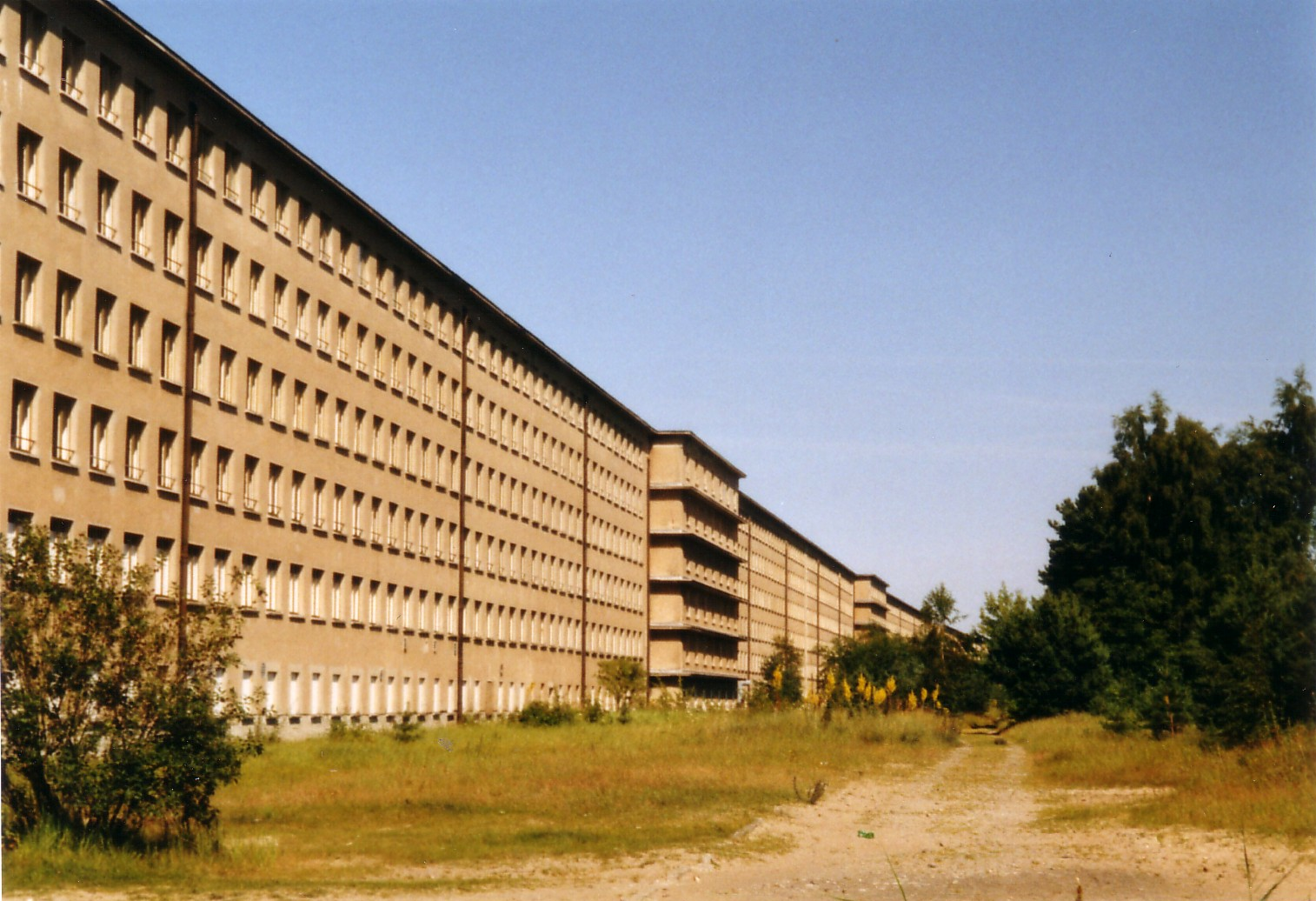
Seaside view of Prora

Clemens Klotz (31 May 1886 – 18 August 1969) was one of Adolf Hitler's architects.

Despite being a former member of the banned Deutsche Werkbund, Klotz joined the NSDAP and was appointed a professor by Hitler. After beginning his career focusing on residential designs in the Cologne area, Klotz received a series of prestigious commissions from the National Socialist (Nazi) Party's German Labor Front (DAF). Some of the most memorable of these commissions included the elite Nazi Party educational complexes at Ordensburg Krössinsee, Ordensburg Vogelsang and Chiemsee; Prora, the massive Nazi Kraft durch Freude seaside spa on the island of Rügen; a new domed train station for Munich; and plans for the complete design of Cologne.

== Literature ==
- Heinen, Franz Albert: NS-Ordensburgen Vogelsang, Sonthofen, Krössinsee. Ch. Links Verlag, Berlin 2011, ISBN 978-3-86153-618-5.
- Sawinski, Rolf: Die Ordensburg Krössinsee in Pommern: Von der NS-Ordensburg zur polnischen Kaserne. Helios, Aachen 2004, ISBN 3-933608-77-5.
- Schmitz-Ehmke, Ruth: Der entwerfende Architekt Clemens Klotz (1886-1969). In: Die Ordensburg Vogelsang. Architektur – Bauplastik – Ausstattung. (= Arbeitsheft des Landeskonservators Rheinland, 41.) Rheinland-Verlag, Köln 1988. / 2., veränderte und erweiterte Auflage, Köln 2003, ISBN 3-7927-1877-4. / 4., neu bearbeitete und erweiterte Auflage, Köln 2010, ISBN 978-3-88462-299-5, S. 54–64.

== See also ==
- Nazi architecture
- Prora
