= Prorer Wiek =

Bight in Germany

Coordinates: 54°27′N 13°38′E

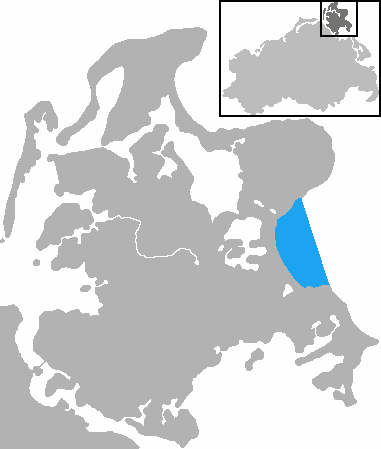
The location of the Prorer Wiek

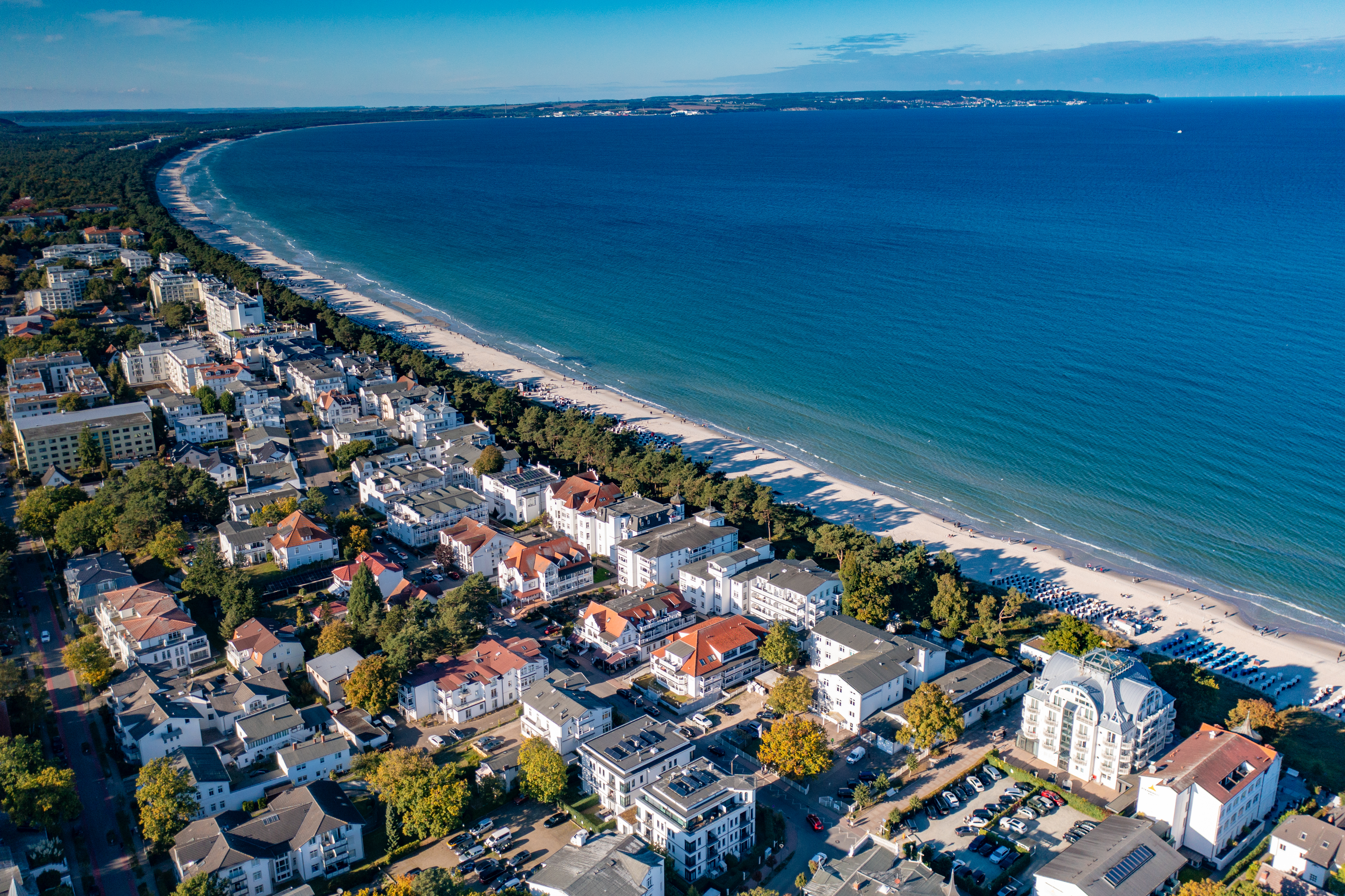

The Prorer Wiek (German pronunciation: [ˈpʁoːʁɐ ˈviːk]) is a bay on Germany's Baltic Sea coast off the bar of Schmale Heide that runs between the peninsula of Jasmund and the Granitz, the region southeast of Binz on the island of Rügen. The resort of Prora lies on the shore of the bay with its former "Strength Through Joy" spa and the seaside resort of Binz. In the northern part of the bay is the Sassnitz Ferry Port near the Sassnitz village of Mukran.
