= NS-Ordensburgen =

Training centers for Nazi military

In Nazi Germany, the NS-Ordensburgen ("National Socialist Order Castles", singular Ordensburg), also called Schulungsburgen, were schools developed for elite Nazi military echelons.

== History ==
There were strict requirements for admission to the schools. Junker candidates had to be aged between 25 and 30 years old, belong to either the Nazi Party, the Hitler Youth, the Sturmabteilung, or the Schutzstaffel, be physically completely healthy, and be pure-blooded with no hereditary defects. The term Ordensburg was borrowed by the Nazis from the historic Teutonic Order, which had built numerous Order Castles (Ordensburgen) during the medieval period.

Under the reforms of the Nazi Party, special schools for the children of important Nazi leaders were established. Adolf Hitler Schools were established for the elementary grades, and Ordensburgen were established for post-secondary school students. These schools were supposed to turn out future Party elite leaders, trained in both technical subjects and Nazi ideology. Ordensburgen were designed for students who had completed the Adolf Hitler Schools, undergone six months of compulsory labor-service training, two years in the army, and who had already chosen their profession.

Because the students were so isolated and their education was so specialized, they were often perceived as arrogant while knowing little of practical value. Many high-ranking Nazi officials chose not to send their children to these schools. Even Martin Bormann sent only one of his more troublesome sons to an Adolf Hitler School, as a form of punishment.

The schools themselves were typically stark, modern structures with extensive facilities. Vogelsang, for instance, reportedly contained the world's largest gymnasium at the time. Each student was supposed to attend all four institutions in sequence, finishing at the historic site of the Medieval Marienburg for training that included live-fire military exercises.

The three institutions for education of political leaders and their educational focuses that were built were:

- Ordensburg Vogelsang in North Rhine-Westphalia

focus: racial philosophy of the new order

- Ordensburg Sonthofen in Bavaria, Allgäu, built in 1934

focus: administrative and military tasks and diplomacy. This facility is used by Germany's Bundeswehr.

- Ordensburg Krössinsee in Pomerania;

focus: development of character

According to the training model, students were to spend one year at each castle in order to become familiar with each educational focus. The fourth and final Ordensburg, planned for the site of the historic Marienburg Castle in West Prussia, was never built.

== Bibliography ==
- Adams, R. J. Order Castles of the Third Reich. Laguna Hills, Calif: Shannon & Co, 2007. https://www.worldcat.org/oclc/712602579
- Arntz, H.-Dieter. Ordensburg Vogelsang 1934-1945: Erziehung zur politischen Führung im Dritten Reich. Euskirchen: Kümpel, 1986. https://www.worldcat.org/oclc/18202471
- Happel, Hartmut, and Mark Jackson. History of the Ordensburg Sonthofen. Immenstadt: Eberl, 2003. https://www.worldcat.org/oclc/181434838
- Heinen, F. A., and Laura McLardy. Ordensburg Vogelsang: The History of the NS-Elite Training Centre in the Eifel. 2014. https://www.worldcat.org/oclc/880840844
- Ley, Robert. Der Weg zur Ordensburg. Berlin: Verlag der Deutschen Arbeitsfront, n.d. https://www.worldcat.org/oclc/13139935
- N[ational-]S[ozialistische] Ordensburg Sonthofen [Gruß an d. im Felde stehenden Kameraden]. Sonthofen: Der Kommandant d. Ordensburg Sonthofen, 1941. https://www.worldcat.org/oclc/72719331
- Sawinski, Rolf. Die Ordensburg Krössinsee in Pommern: von der NS-Ordensburg zur polnischen Kaserne. Aachen: Helios, 2004. https://www.worldcat.org/oclc/56533394
- Schmitz-Ehmke, Ruth. Die Ordensburg Vogelsang: Architektur, Bauplastik, Ausstattung. Köln: Rheinland-Verlag, 1988. https://www.worldcat.org/oclc/21524567
- Schmidt, Friedrich. Des Führers Auftrag an die Schulung: Rede in der Ordensburg Sonthofen vor den Gau- und Kreisschulungsleitern, im Januar 1938. [Germany]: [publisher not identified], 1938.https://www.worldcat.org/oclc/23346222
