= Prora =

Building complex in Rügen, Germany

Coordinates: 54°26′21″N 13°34′32″E

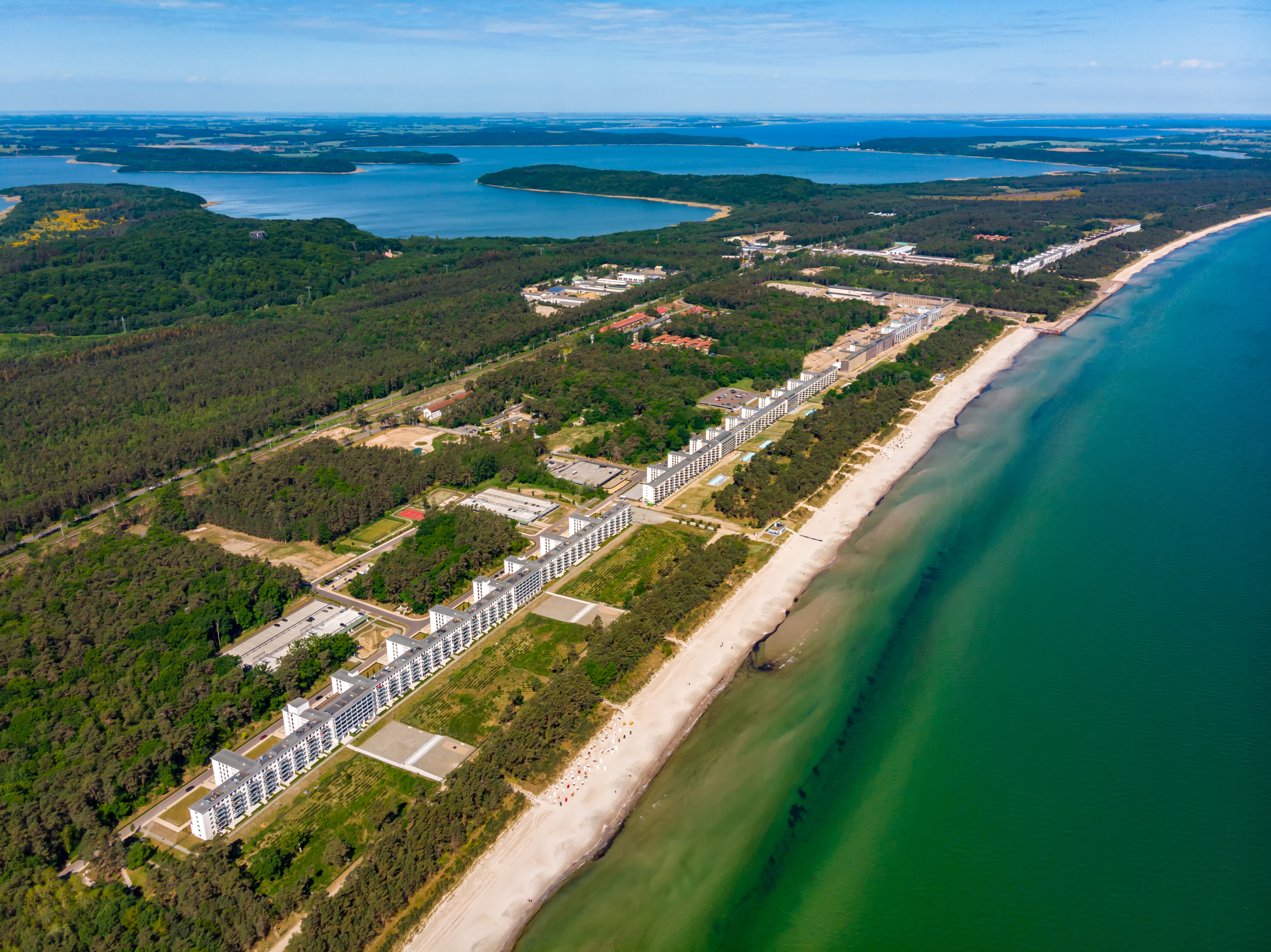
- Aerial view of Prora (2020)

- Location within Germany
- Alternative names: Colossus of Prora

General information
- Type: Beach resort
- Architectural style: Nazi
- Location: Prorer Wiek, Rügen, Germany
- Construction started: 1936
- Construction stopped: 1939 (onset of WWII)
- Cost: 237.5 million ℛ︁ℳ︁
- Owner: Metropole Marketing

Design and construction
- Architects: Clemens Klotz; Erich Putlitz (further unrealized plans)
- Awards: Grand Prix (1937 Paris World Exposition)

Website
- www.proradok.de/en/startseite-2/

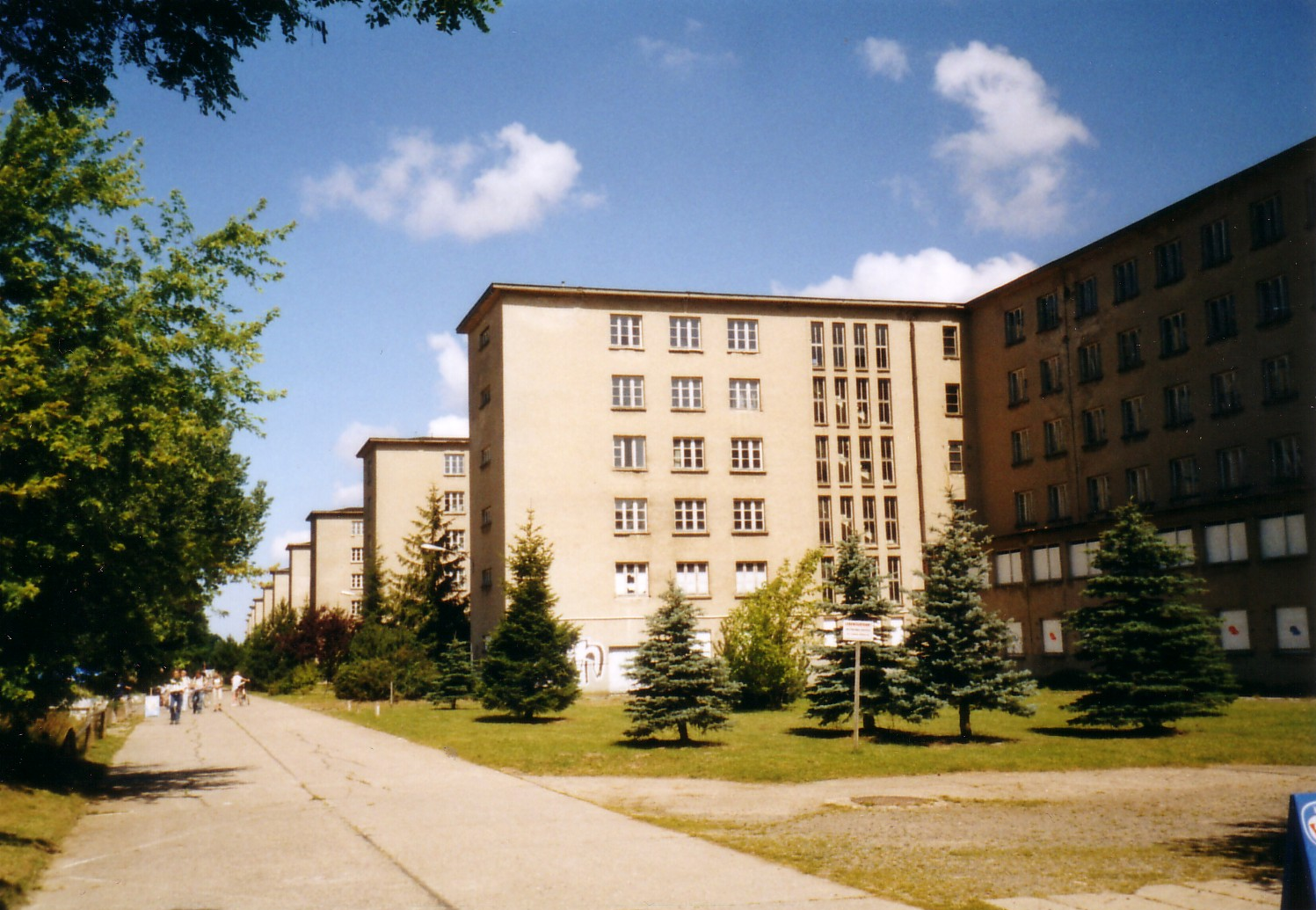
"Koloss von Prora" or the Colossus of Prora

The Colossus of Prora, commonly known as simply "Prora", is a building complex in the municipality of Binz on the island of Rügen, Germany. It was built by Nazi Germany between 1936 and 1939 as part of the Strength Through Joy (Kraft durch Freude or KdF) project. It consisted of eight identical buildings and was 4.5 km (2 3/4 mi) in length parallel to the beach, with the surviving structures stretching 3.0 km (1 7/8 mi).

Although the buildings were planned as a holiday resort, construction was not completed, and they were not used for this purpose. Prora, as it was known, was however used largely by the Nazi Party for propaganda, with the supposed strength and power displayed in the construction effort of the complex likened by the party to that of themselves. After World War II, the complex found various military uses, first by the Soviet Army, then by the East German Volksarmee, and then by the German Bundeswehr. Today, it houses a large youth hostel, a hotel, and holiday apartments.

== Location ==
Prora lies on an extensive bay between the Sassnitz and Binz regions, known as the Prorer Wiek, on the narrow heath (the Prora) which separates the lagoon of the Kleiner Jasmunder Bodden from the Baltic Sea. The buildings extended over a length of 4.5 kilometres (2 3/4 mi) and are roughly 150 metres (160 yd) from the beach. The coast offers a long flat sand beach which stretches from Binz to the ferry port. This beach was thus an ideal location for the establishment of a seaside resort.

== Plans ==
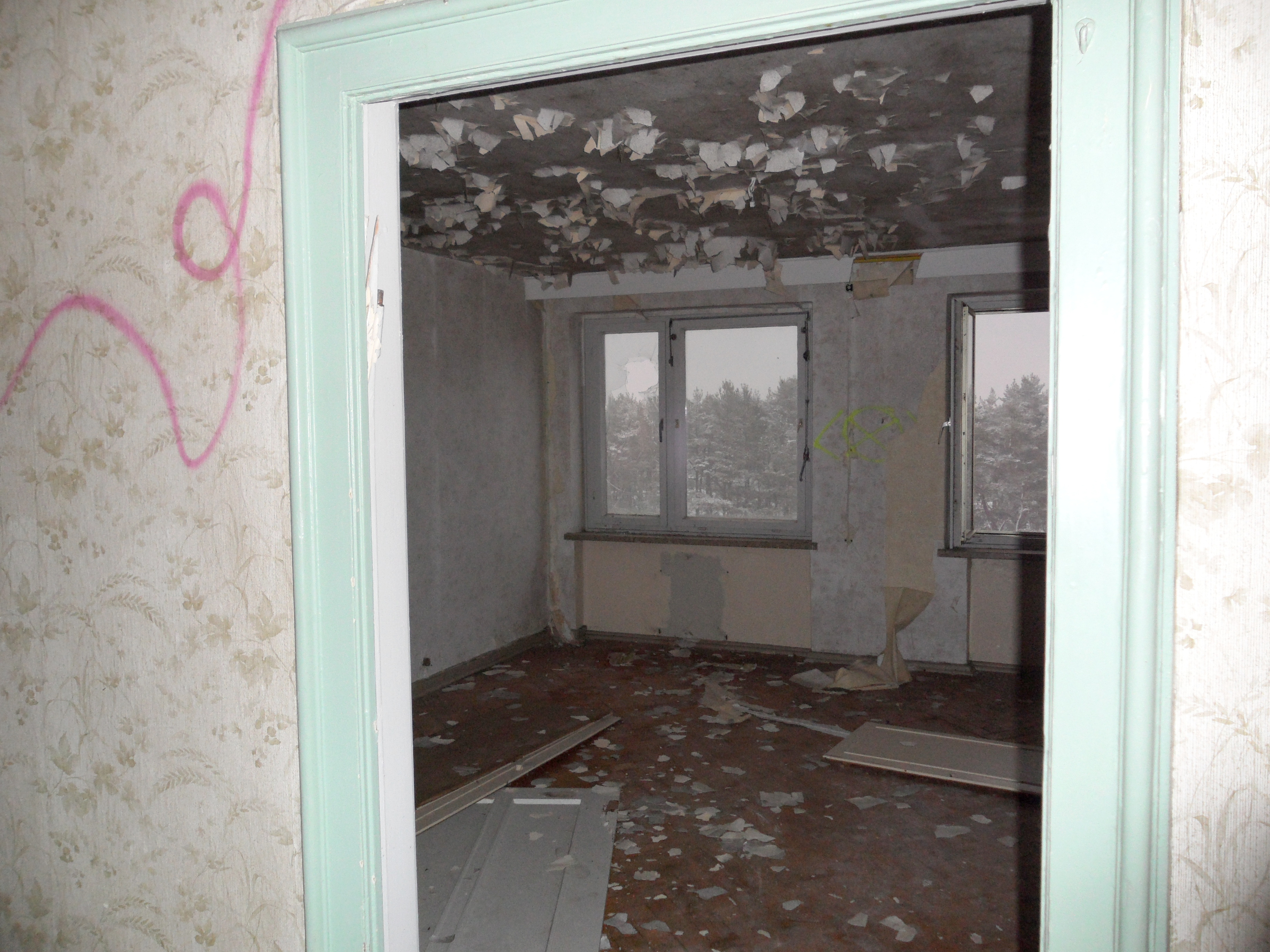
Typical room (December 2010)

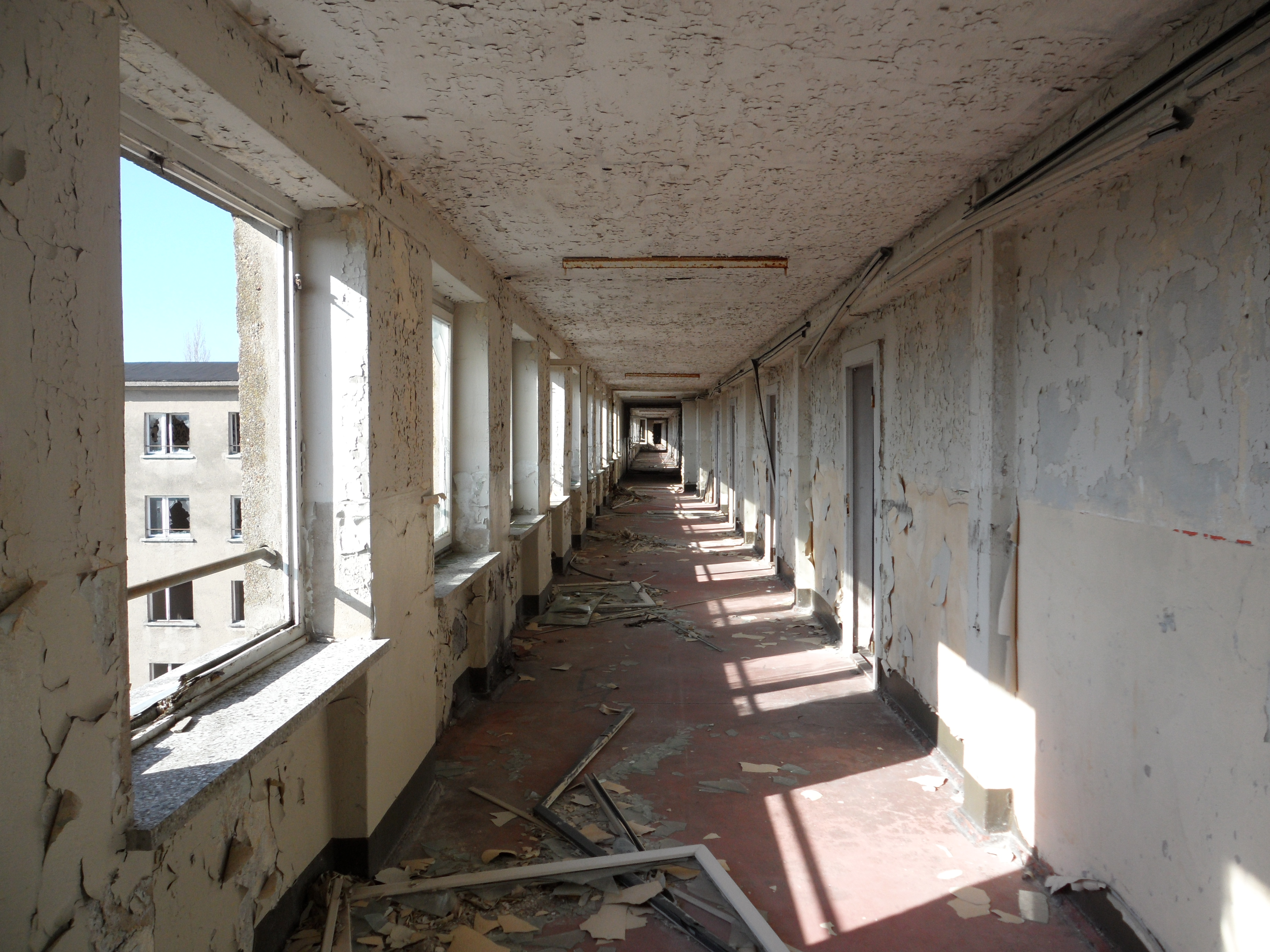
Corridor in building "Nordflügel 1", 4th level (2011)

The Strength Through Joy program was designed to attract the working class – who had during the Weimar Republic been the power base of the Social Democrats and, to a lesser extent, the Communists – to the Nazi Party by offering numerous cultural events and mass tourism at affordable prices. They also presented an opportunity for the inculcation of Nazi ideology through constant indoctrination by propaganda. Founded in November 1933, in the year 1934, 400,000 people took Strength Through Joy package tours, a number which rose to 1.7 million by 1937, not to mention 7 million who availed themselves of weekend excursions and 1.6 million who participated in organized hikes.

Robert Ley, head of the German Labour Front – of which Strength Through Joy was a subsidiary – envisioned Prora as a parallel to Butlins, which were British "holiday camps" designed to provide affordable holidays for the average worker. Prora was designed to house 20,000 holidaymakers, under the idea that every worker deserved a holiday at the beach. Designed by Clemens Klotz, who won a design competition overseen by Adolf Hitler's chief architect Albert Speer, all rooms were planned to overlook the sea, while corridors and sanitation are located on the landward side. Each room of 5 by 2.5 metres (16 by 8 ft) was to have two beds, a wardrobe, and a sink. There were communal toilets, showers, and bathrooms on each floor.

Hitler's plans for Prora were much more ambitious. He wanted a gigantic sea resort, the "most mighty and large one to ever have existed", holding 20,000 beds. In the middle, a huge building was to be erected, which would be a grand hall for speeches and concerts. At the same time, Hitler wanted the complex to have the ability to be converted into a military hospital in case of war. Hitler insisted that the plans of a giant indoor arena by architect Erich zu Putlitz were to be included. Putlitz's Festival Hall was intended to be able to accommodate all 20,000 guests at the same time. His plans included two wave-swimming pools, a cinema, and a theatre. A large dock for passenger ships was also planned.

The designs won a Grand Prix award at the 1937 Paris World Exposition.

== Construction ==
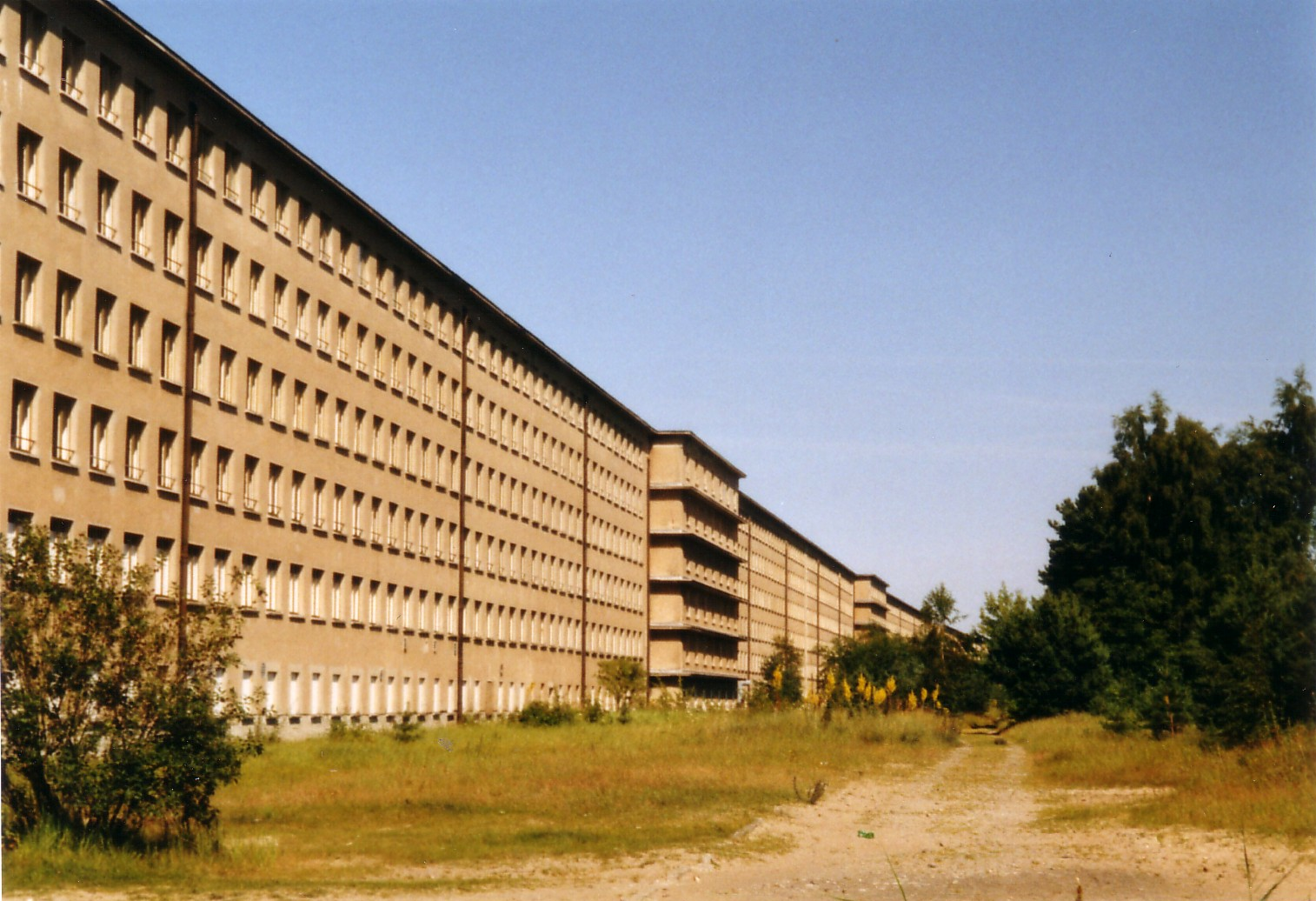
Seaside view of Prora in 2004

Construction began in 1936 and during the few years that Prora was under construction, all major construction companies of the Reich and nearly 9,000 workers were involved in this project. By 1938, construction costs had reached 237.5 million ℛ︁ℳ︁ (equivalent to €1.06 billion in 2009).

With the onset of World War II in 1939, building on Prora stopped and the construction workers transferred to the V-Weapons plant at Peenemünde. The eight housing blocks and the theatre and cinema remained empty shells. The swimming pools and festival hall never materialised. If the complex had been completed, it would have been the largest holiday resort in the world.

== Usage ==
=== World War II ===
During the Allied bombing campaign, many people from Hamburg took refuge in one of the housing blocks, and later refugees from the east of Germany were housed there. By the end of the war, these buildings housed female auxiliary personnel for the Luftwaffe.

=== Cold War ===
In 1945 the Soviet Army took control of the region and established a military base at Prora. The Soviet Army's 2nd Artillery Brigade occupied block 5 of Prora from 1945 to 1955. The Soviet military then stripped all usable materials from the building. In the late 1940s two of the housing blocks – one at the North and one at the South – were demolished and the remains were mostly removed.

In the late 1950s, the East German military rebuilt several of the buildings. Since the buildings had been stripped to the bare brick in the late 1940s, most of the exterior and interior finish that can now be seen was done under East German control. After the formation of the German Democratic Republic's (GDR's) National People's Army in 1956, the buildings became a restricted military area housing several East German Army units. The most prominent were the elite 40. Fallschirmjägerbataillon Willi Sänger (40th Parachute Battalion "Willi Sänger") which was housed in block 5 from 1960 to 1982. Block 4 on the north side was used for urban combat training by the Parachute Battalion and others. Large sections remain as ruins to this day.

Also housed in the building from 1982 to 1990 was the East German Army Construction Battalion "Mukran", where conscientious objectors served as noncombatant Construction Soldiers (Bausoldaten) to meet their military service obligation. A part of the building also served as the East German Army's "Walter Ulbricht" convalescent home.

=== Unified Germany ===
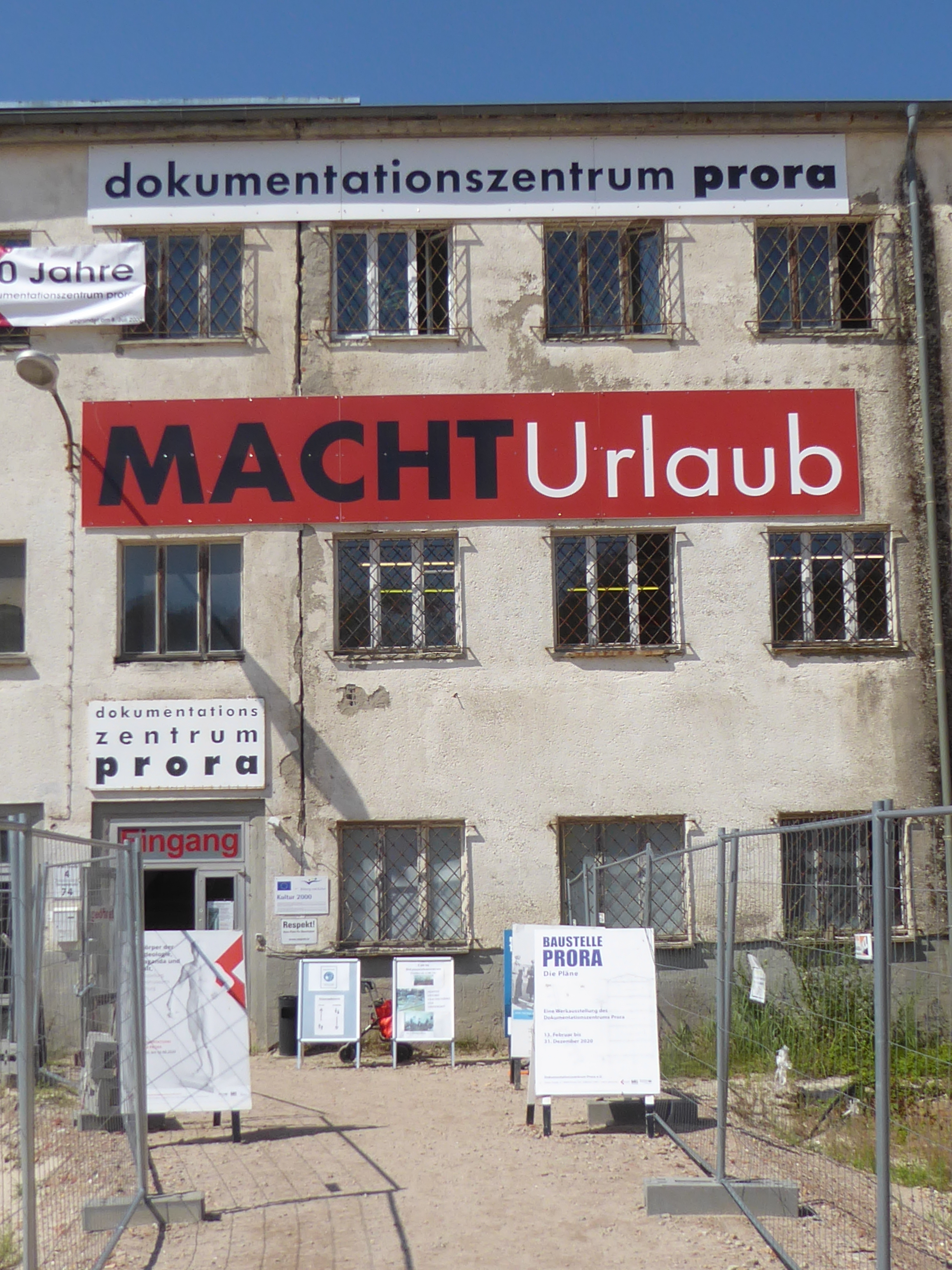
Entrance to Prora Documentation Centre with MACHTUrlaub exhibition, on 17 07 2020

After German reunification in 1990, the National People's Army was absorbed into the West German Bundeswehr, that took over the building. Initially, consideration was given to demolishing the buildings, but it was later given landmark protection and a tax break offered to developers to renovate it. Parts of the building were used from 1990 to 1992 by the Military Technical School of the Bundeswehr. From 1992 to 1994 a part of the building was used to house asylum seekers from the Balkans.

Beginning in early 1993, the facility was empty and the buildings were subject to decay and vandalism. An exception to this was Block 3, Prora Center, which from 1995 to 2005 housed a variety of museums, special exhibitions, and a gallery. Between 1993 and 1999 the site served as one of the largest youth hostels in Europe.

Since 2000, the Documentation Centre Prora has been located at the southern edge of the fairground buildings. This center documents the construction and use history of the building. Discussed here are both the background of the project and its appropriation for Nazi propaganda.

== Sale and redevelopment ==
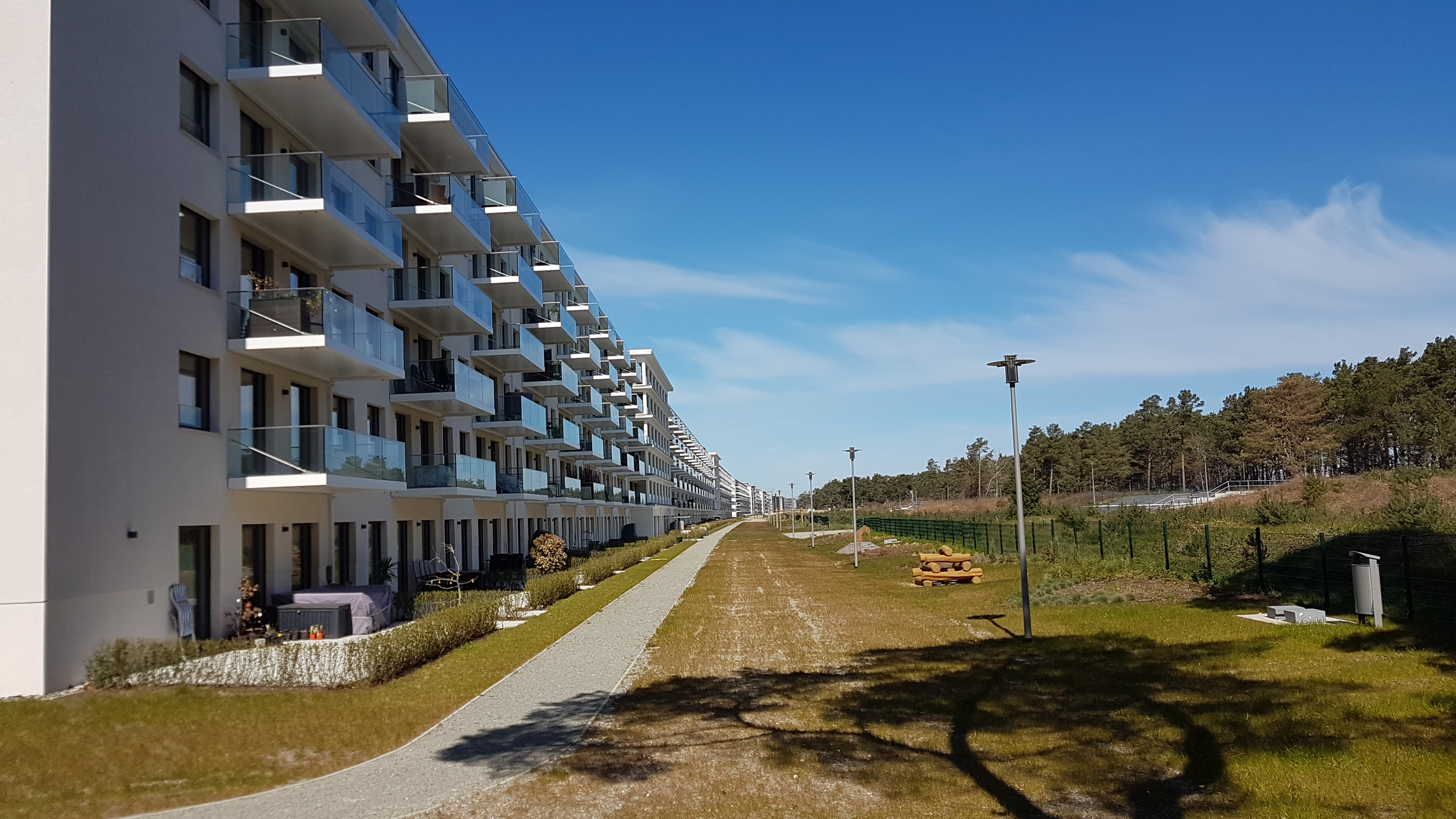
In 2019 after renovation

In 2004, following more than a decade of unsuccessful attempts to sell the site as a whole, the blocks of the building began being sold off individually for various uses. On 23 September 2004, Block 6 sold for €625,000 to an unknown bidder. On 23 February 2005, Block 3, the former Museum Mile, was sold to Inselbogen GmbH, which announced that the building would be used as a hotel. In October 2006, blocks 1 and 2 were sold to Prora Projektentwicklungs GmbH which announced plans of converting the buildings into shops and apartments. However, Block 1 was re-offered for sale at an auction on 31 March 2012 and was purchased by a Berlin investor for €2.75 million.

In November 2006, the Federal Agency for Real Estate purchased Block 5. With financial support from the federal government and the state of Mecklenburg-Vorpommern it planned to establish a youth hostel in the building. Located in the northernmost part of the complex, it was divided into five contiguous parts.

In late 2008, plans were approved to have Prora fill its original purpose and turn it into a modern tourist resort. The council set out plans to build enough living space to house 3,000 people, as well as a youth hostel, and amenities for tourists. Kerstin Kassner, a local councillor, compared Prora's shore with a "Caribbean beach". However, the decision met with some skepticism from Binz locals, who felt that there were already too many tourists in the region, and Heike Tagsold, a Prora historian, who said that the town's past made it an inappropriate location for tourists. Nevertheless, in 2011 the long-planned large youth hostel with 402 beds in 96 rooms opened; it is the largest youth hostel in Germany and has been popular. A possible expansion of the facility aimed toward budget-minded tourists has been proposed.

In September 2010, plans were announced by a German-Austrian investor group to renovate blocks 1 and 2 as housing for the elderly and a hotel with 300 beds that includes tennis courts, and swimming pool, and a small shopping centre. The investment costs are estimated at €100 million.

=== Metropole Marketing ===
In 2013, a German company, Metropole Marketing, bought the rights to refurbish Prora and market the units as summer homes. By that year, refurbished apartments in the so-called Colossus were on sale for as much as €700,000 each. The completion date was estimated as 2016. In 2016, the first of the new apartments opened in Block 1. The Prora Solitaire hotel in Block 2 opened for the summer of 2016, and some reconstructed flats were for sale in that Block by mid 2017. At that time, four of the buildings were in the process of redevelopment, a fifth was used as a youth hostel while the remaining three remained in ruins.

A November 2017 update indicated that most of the units (flats) in Block 1 had been sold, having been marketed as summer homes for those who live in Hamburg and Berlin. Many were listed by owners as short term rentals.

== In popular culture ==
Prora was featured in the video game Civilization V, specifically within the expansion pack Civilization V: Brave New World. It appears in the game as a world wonder associated with the ideology of Autocracy.

It was the setting of the 2012 short film Prora.

Prora is the setting for the first and fifth of the series of crime novels by David Young set in pre-unification East Germany: Stasi Child (2016) and Stasi Winter (2020). Both stories feature a fictional Jugendwerkhof, a workhouse for juvenile delinquents, located in the planned holiday resort.

== Sources ==
- Kaule, Martin: Prora. Geschichte und Gegenwart des »KdF-Seebads Rügen«. Ch. Links Verlag, Berlin 2014, ISBN 978-3-86153-767-0.
- Rostock, Jürgen, Zadniček, Franz: Paradiesruinen – Das KdF-Seebad der Zwanzigtausend auf Rügen. Ch. Links Verlag, Berlin 2008, ISBN 978-3-86153-414-3.
- Spode, Hasso: Fordism, Mass Tourism and the Third Reich: the Strength through Joy Seaside Resort as an Index Fossil. In: Journal of Social History. 38(2004), S. 127–155. (ed. 2016)
- Wernicke, Joachim, Schwartz, Uwe: Der Koloss von Prora auf Rügen – gestern – heute – morgen. 3., erweiterte u. aktualisierte Auflage. Langewiesche, Prora/Königstein im Taunus. 2015, ISBN 978-3-7845-4903-3.
- Wolter, Stefan: Prora – Inmitten der Geschichte. Bd. I: Der südliche Koloss und die Erinnerungskultur, Norderstedt 2015, ISBN 978-3738632378.
- Wolter, Stefan: Prora – Inmitten der Geschichte. Bd. II: Der nördliche Koloss mit Jugendherberge, Norderstedt 2015, ISBN 978-3738629811.
