= Ordensburg Krössinsee =

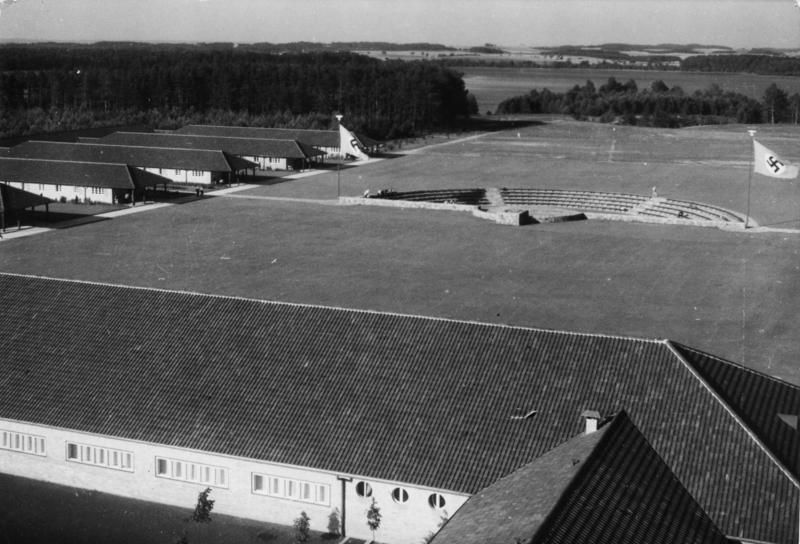
- Section of Ordensburg Krössinsee

General information
- Status: Completed
- Architectural style: Nazi architecture
- Location: Złocieniec
- Coordinates: 53°32′57″N 16°02′34″E
- Owner: Polish Armed Forces

Ordensburg Krössinsee (also Crössinsee, now Budowo) was the first of three NS-Ordensburgen, educational centers constructed in Germany in the 1930s for cadres of the Nazi Party. It was built near what was then the city of Falkenburg in Pomerania, today Złocieniec in Poland.

Today, this former Nazi training centre is used by the 2nd Battalion, 12th Tank Brigade of the Polish Land Forces.

== History ==
The groundbreaking for Ordensburg Krössinsee was on 22 April 1934. It was designed by the Cologne architect Clemens Klotz. The vast construction of rustic stone buildings with granite foundations was built at a cost of 20 million Reichsmarks, and the facility was officially dedicated on 24 April 1936. On 16 May 1941, the Ordensburg was renamed "Die Falkenburg am Krössinsee" (The Falcon Castle at Lake Krössin) by the Reichs Minister of Labor, Dr. Robert Ley. On 29 June 1944, a small portion of the complex was destroyed by fire.

Ordensburg Krössinsee was one of three NS-Ordensburgen, the others being Ordensburg Sonthofen in Allgäu and Ordensburg Vogelsang in Eifel. A fourth was planned, but never built, at (the historic) Ordensburg Marienburg in West Prussia, known today as Malbork Castle in Poland.

== Student requirements ==
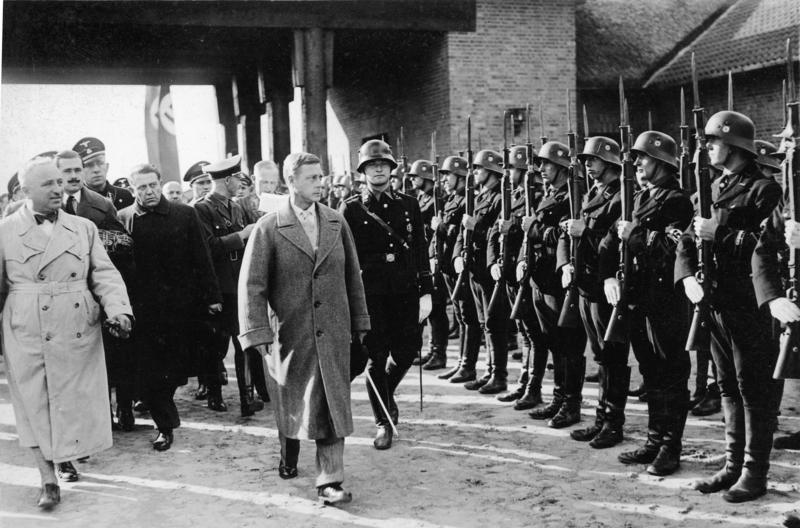
Edward, the Duke of Windsor on a visit to the Ordensburg Krössinsee 1937 (together with Robert Ley on the left in a white coat)

The Commander of the Ordensburg was Otto Gohdes. Cadets, known as Ordens Junkers, were required to be at least 5 feet 4 inches (1.63 m), between 23 and 26 years old, racially pure and in good health without any physical limitations. At the outbreak of World War II, a very high percentage of Junkers were killed in action.

== Daily routine ==
Two courses of studies took place here from 1937–38 and 1938-39. Classes began each morning at 7 and included studies in philosophy, politics and world history. Afternoons were devoted to military drills, battle tactics, sports and equestrian techniques. The school was recognized for its outstanding equestrian program. The nearby lake provided the means for students to develop rowing and sailing skills.

== Hitler Youth ==
In 1937, the cadres began sharing the facility with members of the Hitlerjugend or Hitler Youth. These boys between 12–18 years old eventually became the sole occupants of all three Order Castles with the invasion of Poland in 1939 and the start of World War II.

== Facility details ==
Finished facilities

- Hall of Honour (Ehrenhalle)
- Ceremonial place (Feierplatz)
- 20 living quarters
- Sports field
- Appeal field
- Drill ground
- Riding arena with barns
- Community house
- Dining-hall
- Educational hall
- Dwelling for the commander
- House for the female employees
- Buildings for the administration
- Seminar rooms
- Sick bay
- Pig breeding
- Clarification plant
- Two towers (four were planned)

Planned but unrealized facilities

- Hotel
- Swimming pool
- Water sports facility

== Time capsule ==
During the construction of the Ordensburg Krössinsee, a copper cylinder time capsule was buried in the foundation of one of the towers, presumably in April 1934 when construction of the Nazi facility commenced. The capsule was opened by archaeologists in 2016, more than 80 years after it had been buried. Although the archeologists had long known that the time capsule was buried in the building foundation, they were not able to access it until 2016, and had to wade through groundwater, cut through thick concrete and evade potential German mines in order to reach it.

Unlike many time capsules, the contents of which are often damaged or destroyed by water, the contents of this capsule were perfectly preserved. The contents included photographs (including images of Adolf Hitler), newspapers from 1934, coins, books (including two copies of Mein Kampf), and promotional and historical materials about what was then the town of Falkenburg. The contents were transferred to the National Museum in Szczecin for cataloguing, translation, preservation and display.

== Literature ==
- Rolf Sawinski: Die Ordensburg Krössinsee in Pommern (Gebundene Ausgabe), Aachen 2004, ISBN 3-933608-77-5
