= Eifel National Park =

National Park in North Rhine-Westphalia, Germany

- Nationalpark Eifel
- IUCN category II (national park)
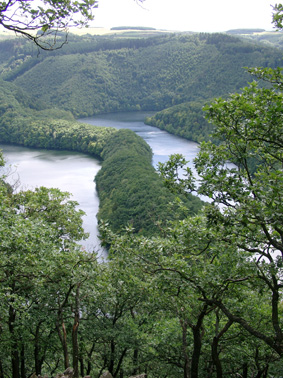
- View from Kermeter of the Urft Reservoir

- Location within Germany
- Location: North Rhine-Westphalia, Germany
- Nearest city: Mechernich, Düren, Aachen
- Coordinates: 50.6166667°N 6.4333333°E
- Area: 10,700 ha (26,400 acres)
- Established: 1 January 2004
- Website: Official website

The Eifel National Park (German: Nationalpark Eifel) is the 14th national park in Germany and the first in North Rhine-Westphalia. The park was founded in 2004, and is classified as a "national park in development".

Eifel National Park is part of the much larger High Fens – Eifel Nature Park, a cross-border protection between Germany and Belgium established in 1960.

== General ==
The aims of the Eifel National Park accord with those set out by the International Union for Conservation of Nature and Natural Resources, IUCN. These require that at least 75 percent of the national park's area must be left to develop naturally – i.e. must not be given over to human use – within 30 years of the foundation of the park. Aims, mechanisms and executive bodies are laid down in the National Park Regulation (Nationalpark-Verordnung or NP-VO). The relatively young national park lies in the north of the Eifel region between Nideggen in the north, Gemünd in the south and the Belgian border in the southwest. The legal decree by the state that lays the foundation for the park has been in force since 1 January 2004.

The area covers about 10,700 hectares (26,000 acres), is bordered to the northwest by the Rur Reservoir and includes the neighbouring Urft Reservoir, the former Vogelsang Military Training Area, but not the Nazi Ordensburg Vogelsang itself. The terrain of the former military training area run by the Belgian Armed Forces and used by NATO troops, the Dreiborn Plateau, forms about 3,300 hectares (8,200 acres) of the entire area and has been open to the public since 1 January 2006.

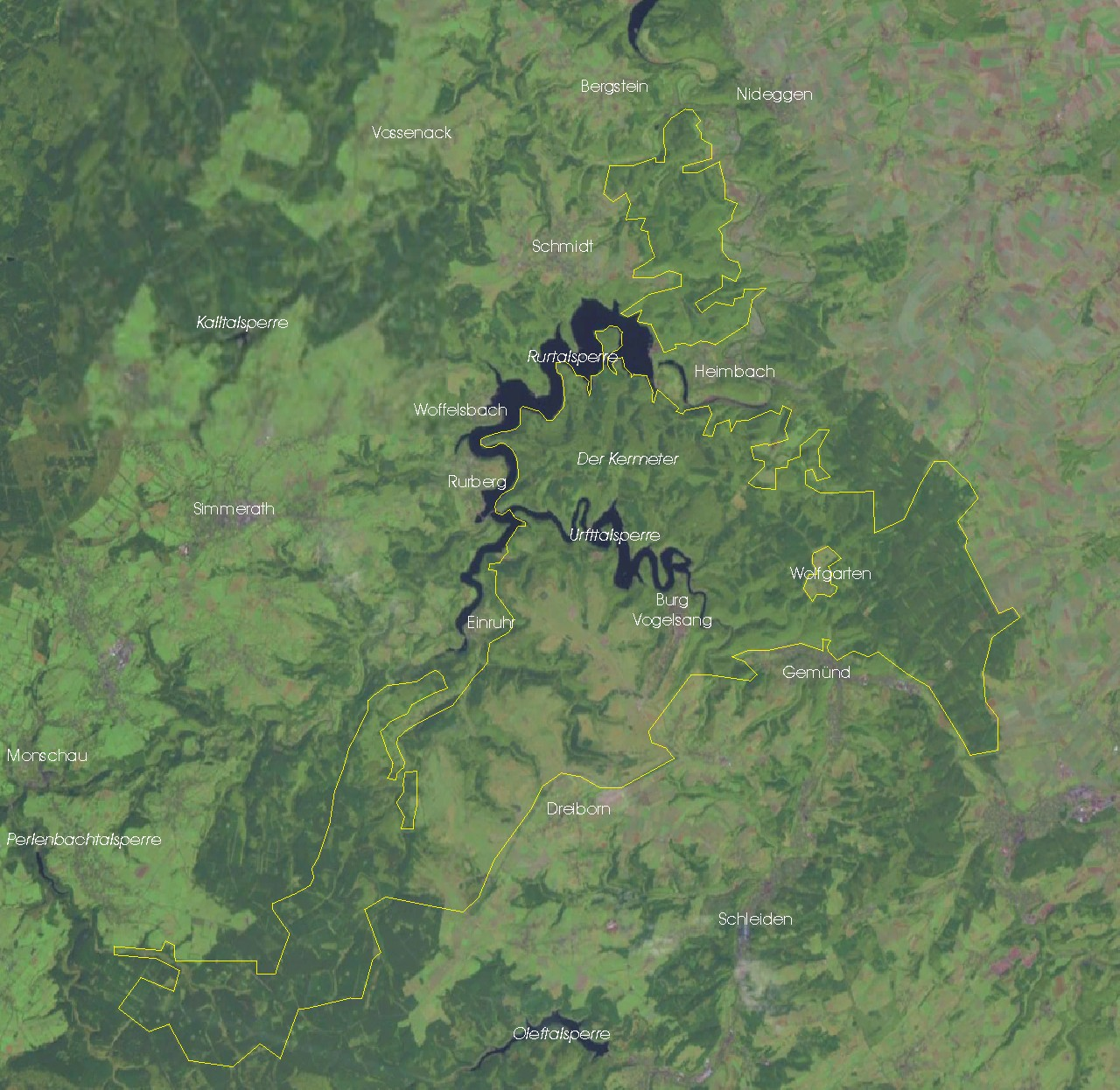
The terrain of the national park

The Eifel National Park protects the wood-rush and beech woods that flourish in the maritime climate and which have been preserved to this day in parts of the North Eifel, but which originally covered the entire Eifel region as well as large parts of Central Europe. An area of 110 square kilometres (42 sq mi) is covered by deciduous and coniferous woods, lakes, streams and open grassland. One large contiguous stretch of forest with a high percentage of beech woods is the region known as the Kermeter. This forested area is accessible and offers a large number of interesting walks.

The Eifel National Park is home to over 7,100 animal and plant species of which 1,800 are classified as endangered on the red list of North Rhine-Westphalia. A total of 1,300 species of beetle alone have been discovered in its woods. Amongst the other forms of wildlife in the park are the European wildcat, the black stork, the middle spotted woodpecker and the wall lizard which is a rarity in the state of North Rhine-Westphalia.

Exploitation of the forests, especially for the production of charcoal, resulted in the clearing of trees over much of the Eifel by the early 19th century. The Prussians in the 19th century planted large parts of the Eifel with spruce. The planting of this type of tree was further encouraged after the Second World War. Spruce trees grow faster than many species of deciduous tree and enable more rapid reforestation. Because, following its designation as a national park, nature was left to itself in many areas, large numbers of conifers fell victim to bark beetle. The ridge of Kermeter, which is surrounded to the north and west by the Rur Reservoir and to the south by the Urft Reservoir, was particularly hard hit, because the very low precipitation there is ideal for bark beetles. This is a natural process, albeit one that needs to be monitored. In a timely fashion, it helps to prevent the spread of conifer woods outside the national parks. The repopulation of the southern part of national park area with beeches is being gently encouraged. This involves a degree of so-called 'initial planting'. But there are also areas that need no more intervention. The beech trees thrive well in shade and their natural rejuvenation may also be found today beneath the spruce trees. Nevertheless, it will be several decades before the beech is once again the dominant species.

The target of the national park is to reach protection and preservation without intervention on 75% of the area of the national park within 30 years of the creation of the national park, i.e. by 2034. 10 years after the founding of the national park 58% of the area is already realised. Forest development activities still take place particularly in the spruce-dominated south.

== Path network ==
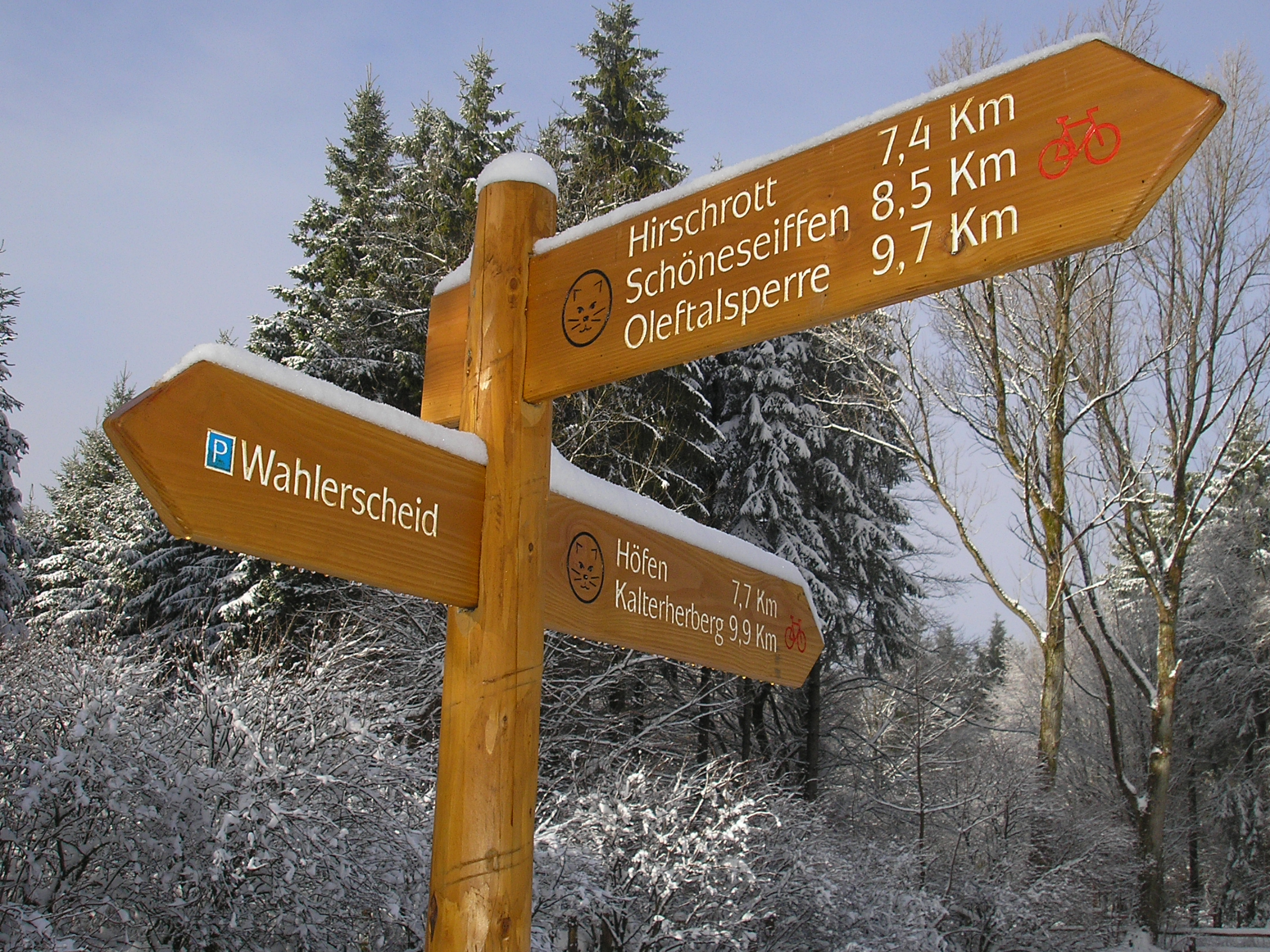
Wooden signposts for several paths

Around 240 kilometres (150 mi) of paths are open to visitors of the Eifel National Park. Cyclists may use 104 kilometres (65 mi) of these and riders 65 kilometres (40 mi). When there is sufficient snow there are also five kilometres of cut trails for cross-country skiing. All paths are marked with wooden signs and shown on the current walking map issued by the Eifel Club. On the former Vogelsang Military Training Area, the Dreiborn Plateau, there are additional knee-height posts with a coloured band indicating the correct routes. This is due to the deadly danger of mines that may have been left behind to the side of the paths.

Several paths are well-signed across the whole park. Specially established in the nature reserve and underpinned by associated literature are the circular 'themed' tours and the four-day Wilderness Trail (Wildnis-Trail).

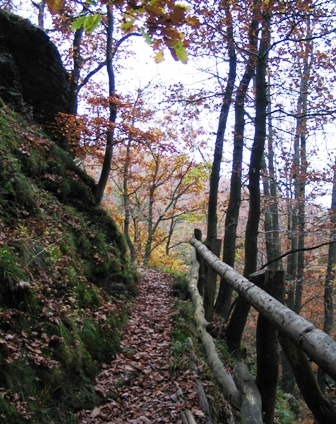
Section of the Wilderness Trail near Laykaul

Visitors can cross the whole park with its different landscapes in four challenging one-day stages. The Wilderness Trail is laid out so that it runs from Monschau-Höfen in the southwest in numerous bends to the northernmost point of the nature reserve to Hürtgenwald-Zerkall. Fallen logs, old giant trees and new offshoots give an insight today in several places of how in decades past it might have looked everywhere.

== National Park gates ==
In order to receive visitors and provide tourist information the national park management has established four gates to the park. The gates are open daily and entry is free. In addition to basic information each information centre offers a different theme.

At the Rurberg Gate on the Eiserbachdamm their motto is "life veins of nature" (Lebensadern der Natur) and water is the central theme of the permanent exhibition. In Gemünd visitors experience the history of the forest at the Kurgarten Gate. In Heimbach, in an old station building, "forest secrets" (Waldgeheimnisse) are the main themes. At the Höfen Gate, narcissus meadows are a focal point. The largest occurrence of yellow wild narcissi in Germany begins at the edge of the "federal gold village" (Bundesgolddorfes). In Nideggen it is about man and nature itself, focusing on the logistics of nature.

== Guided tours ==
The park offers regular, free guided tours with a trained ranger. Visitors may choose from at least eight different tours each week. Bookings are not necessary. En route the ranger will not just teach things, but also recount anecdotes and his or her own experiences. The circular walks are all suitable for blind people or those with impaired sight with their own guides as well as for families with children. The so-called ranger meetings (Rangertreffpunkte) are tailored to the ability and requirements of all participants.

In addition to the ranger tours and meetings there are irregular or seasonal events with trained forest guides, multilingual tours, walks with sign-language guidance, ranger-led boat trips, horse and coach trips and more. The monthly family days are particularly geared to children and parents and, during the local state school holidays, take place on Tuesdays and Fridays as well. Information about all these events and group bookings with the forest guides is available at the Eifel National Park Forestry Office (Nationalparkforstamt Eifel).

== Minefield danger ==
No entry post with a warning about munitions on the old military training area

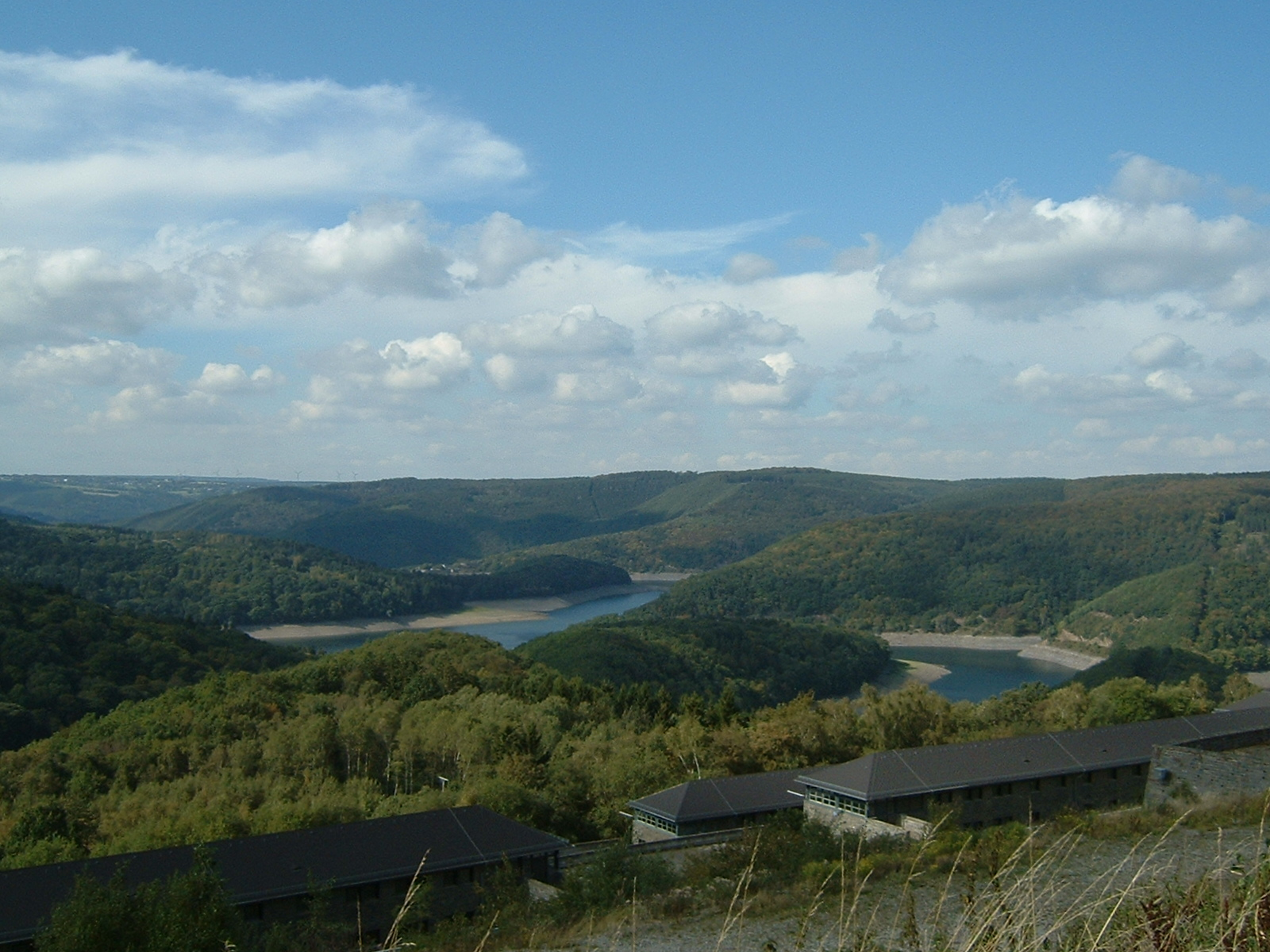
View from the Nazi Ordensburg Vogelsang of the valley and the Urft Reservoir

Several parts of the national park will not be open to the public for a long time. Anti-personnel minefields, sown with Glasmine 43 mines dating from the Second World War period, still exist near the dam of the Urft Reservoir. These sorts of mine cannot be easily cleared because there is still no device able to detect them. Even explosive-sniffing dogs cannot be used here because traces of explosive have been spread through the soil as a result of the fighting. Injuries caused by such mines are extremely difficult to treat medically because the glass splinters cannot be picked up by X-rays. Another type of mine laid here – the concrete mine (Betonmine) – may have become deactivated as a result of the ingress of moisture; that is not possible with glass mines, because they are much better protected from moisture.

The areas of the park that were sown with glass mines are fenced off and marked with warning tape; entering them is strictly forbidden.

== Films ==
- Im Nationalpark Eifel. Dokumentarfilm, 45 Min., Deutschland, 2005, von Ina Knobloch und Manfred Praxl, Produktion: MDR. Kurzbeschreibung des MDR

== See also ==
- High Fens – Eifel Nature Park
