= Vogelsang Training Area =

Military training area in Germany

Coordinates: 50.579592°N 6.423858°E

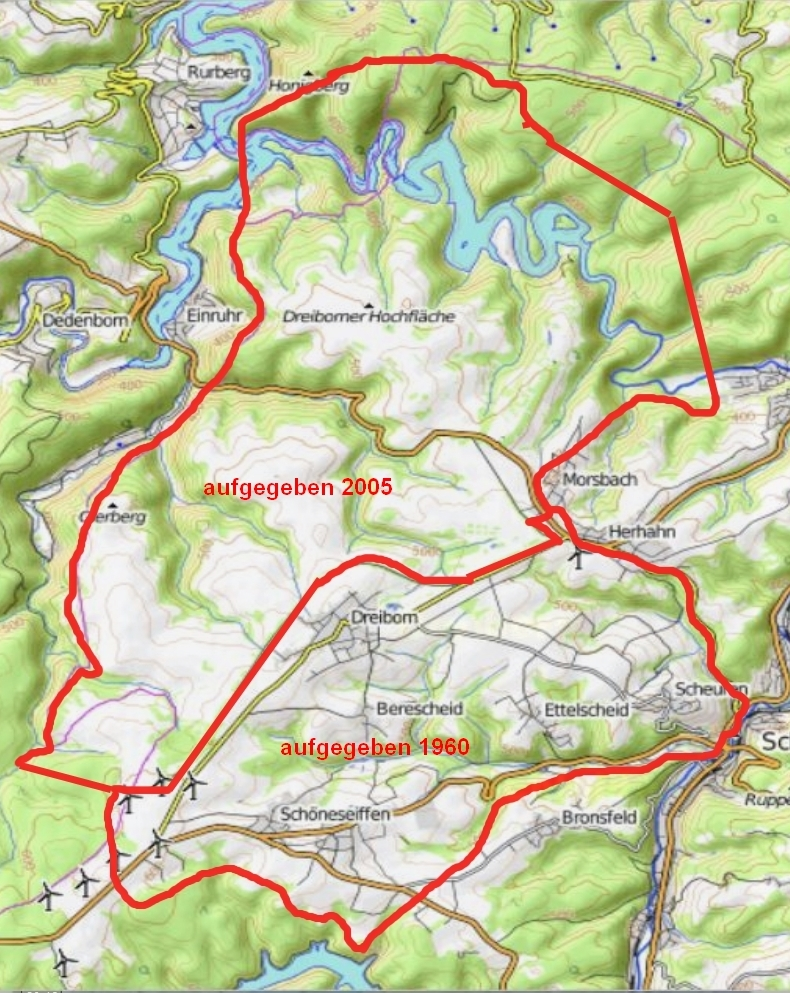
Vogelsang Training Area

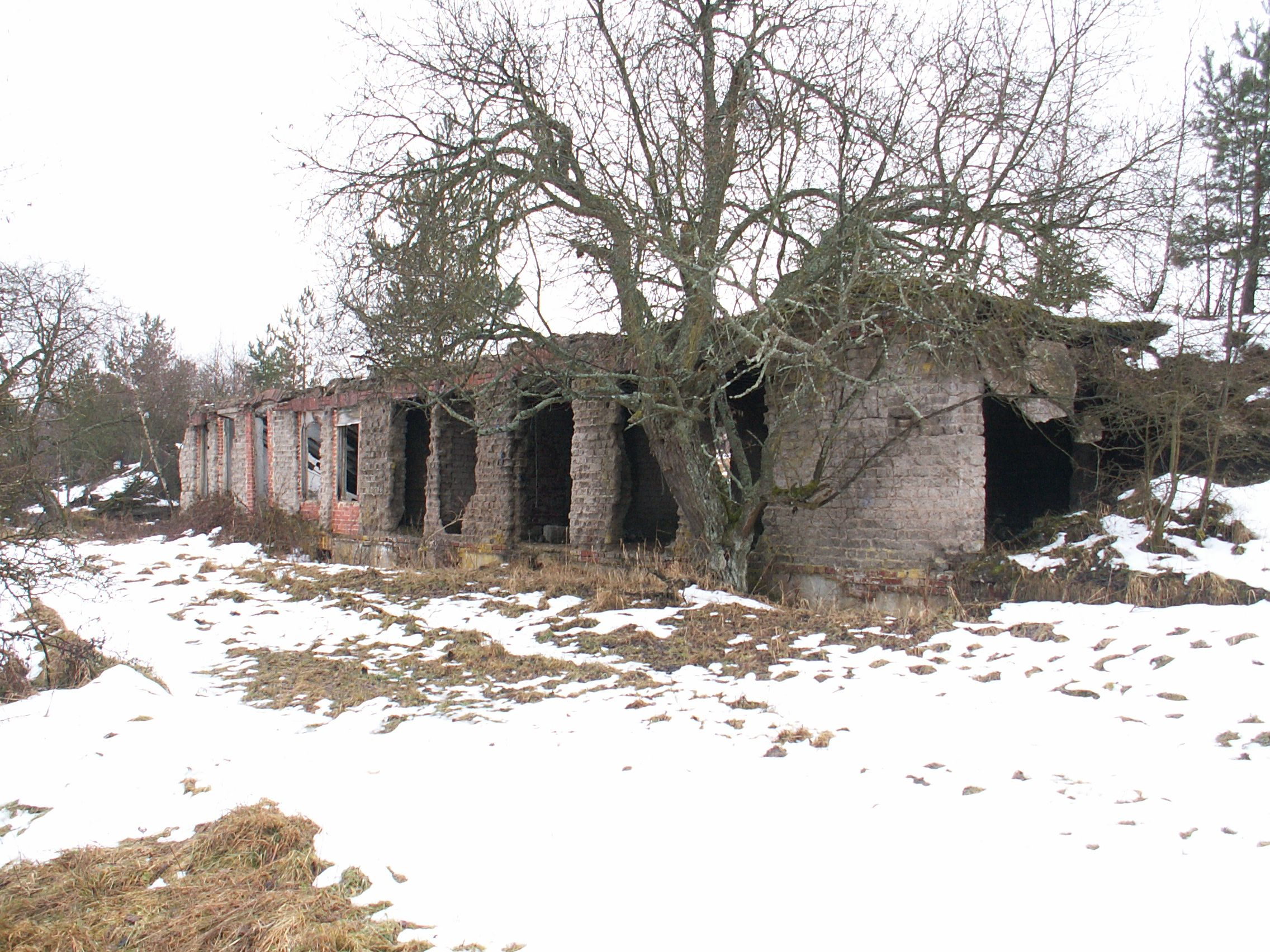
Destroyed building in the planned village of Vogelsang on the tank training area

The Vogelsang Training Area (German: Truppenübungsplatz Vogelsang) lays in the German North Eifel hills between the villages of Simmerath, Heimbach and Schleiden in the state of North Rhine-Westphalia. It was established in 1946 and handed back at the end of 2005, and consisted of the grounds of the former Nazi leadership training centre in the fort of Vogelsang (Ordensburg Vogelsang) on the Erpenscheid hill plus additional terrain including the so-called Dreiborn Plateau. In the north and east it was bounded by the Urft Reservoir. The training area had an area of around 45 km^{2} and since 1 January 2006 has been fully incorporated into the Eifel National Park.

Until 1950 the training area was run by the British Armed Forces and thereafter until 31 December 2005 by the Belgian Army.

== History ==
=== Origins ===
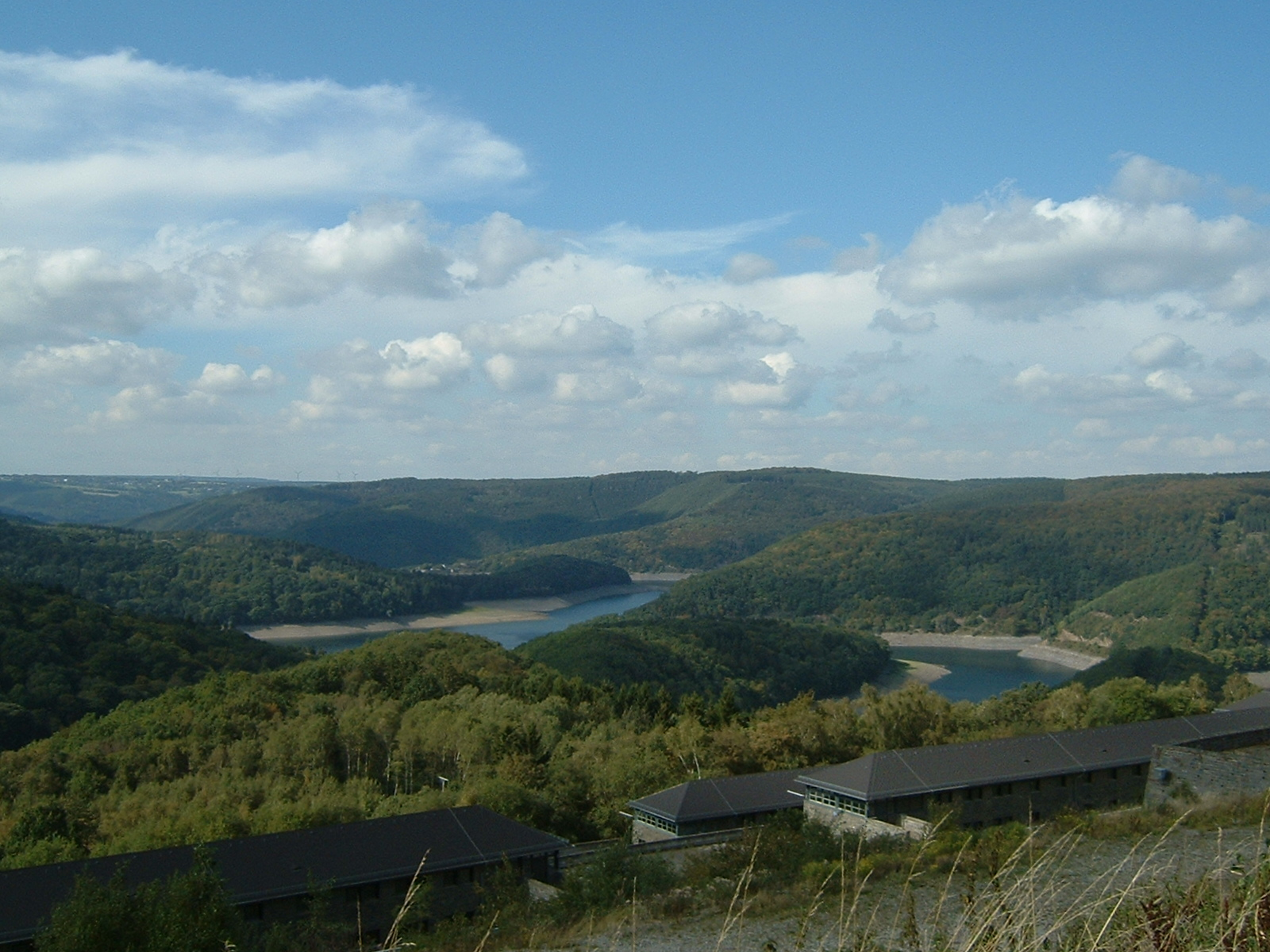
View from the Nazi Ordensburg of Vogelsang into the valley

The basis of the subsequent military training area was the Nazi Ordensburg Vogelsang. This training centre is the second largest relic of Nazi infrastructure in Germany by area after their party congress site in Nuremberg and covered an area of some 100 hectares. The buildings under heritage conservation alone cover a gross floor area of more than 50,000 square metres.

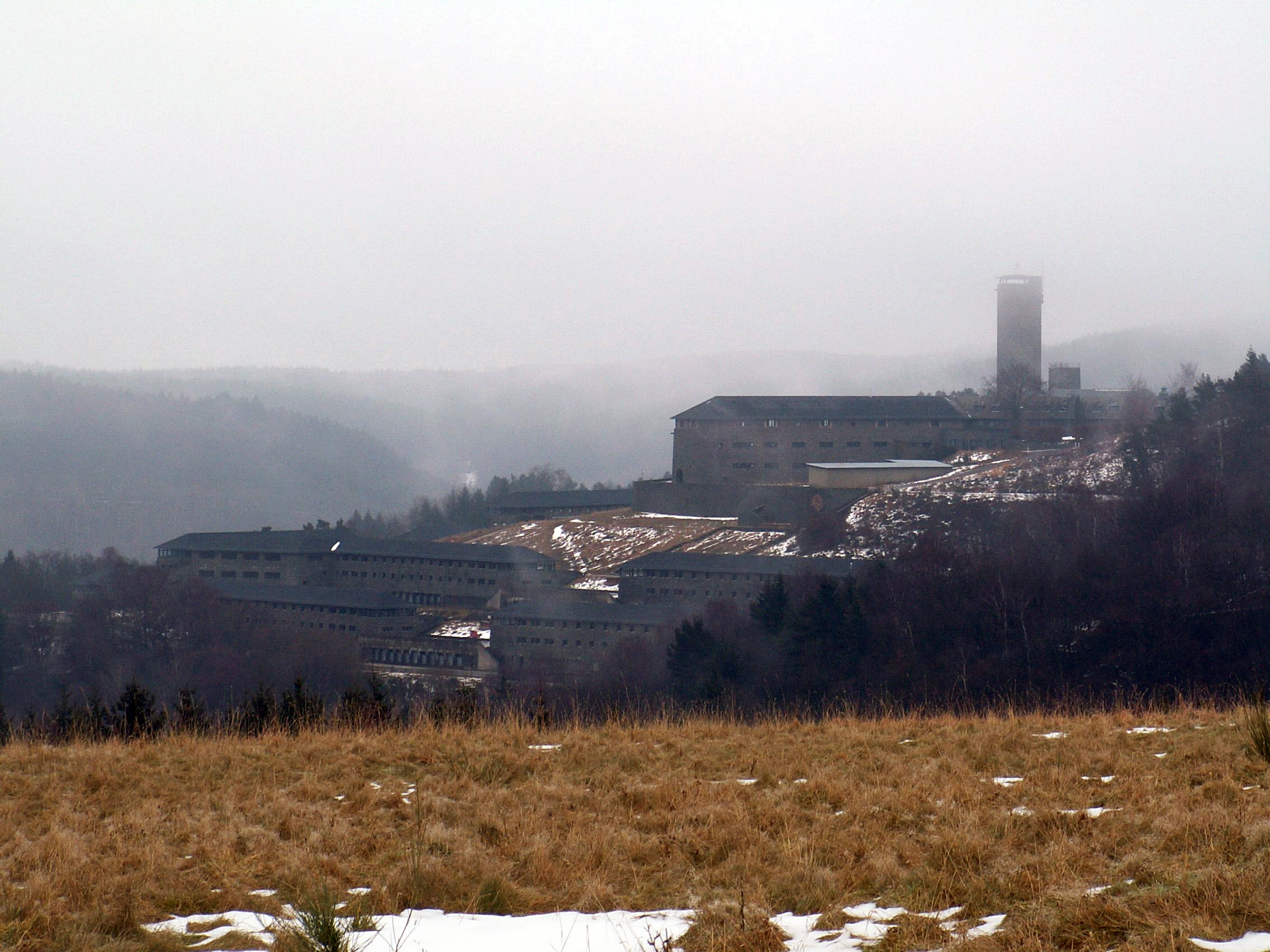
The Ordensburg with its "comradeship houses" (Kameradschaftshäuser)

=== British use from 1946 ===
After the end of the Second World War, in early 1946, the British Military Government considered for a while tearing down this prominent symbol of Nazism. In September 1946 the British commandeered 42 square kilometres of land around the fort as a military training area, ejecting the population of the nearby village of Wollseifen in doing so. In 1950 the British handed over the Vogelsang Training Area to the Belgian Armed Forces. However, under the terms of the transfer of ownership British Armed Forces continued to use the Camp. Offering a mix of military and outdoor pursuits for a period of around two weeks.

It was a popular destination for British troops as an alternative to base barracks life.

In 1989, the Berlin Wall fell and the Iron Curtain as well. The German reunification took place on 3 October 1990. The British Army of the Rhine (BAOR) and Royal Air Force Germany (RAFG) were disbanded in 1994, following the end of the Cold War and the Options for Change defence review in the early 1990s.

The Vogelsang Training Area was closed.

=== Belgian use from 1950 ===
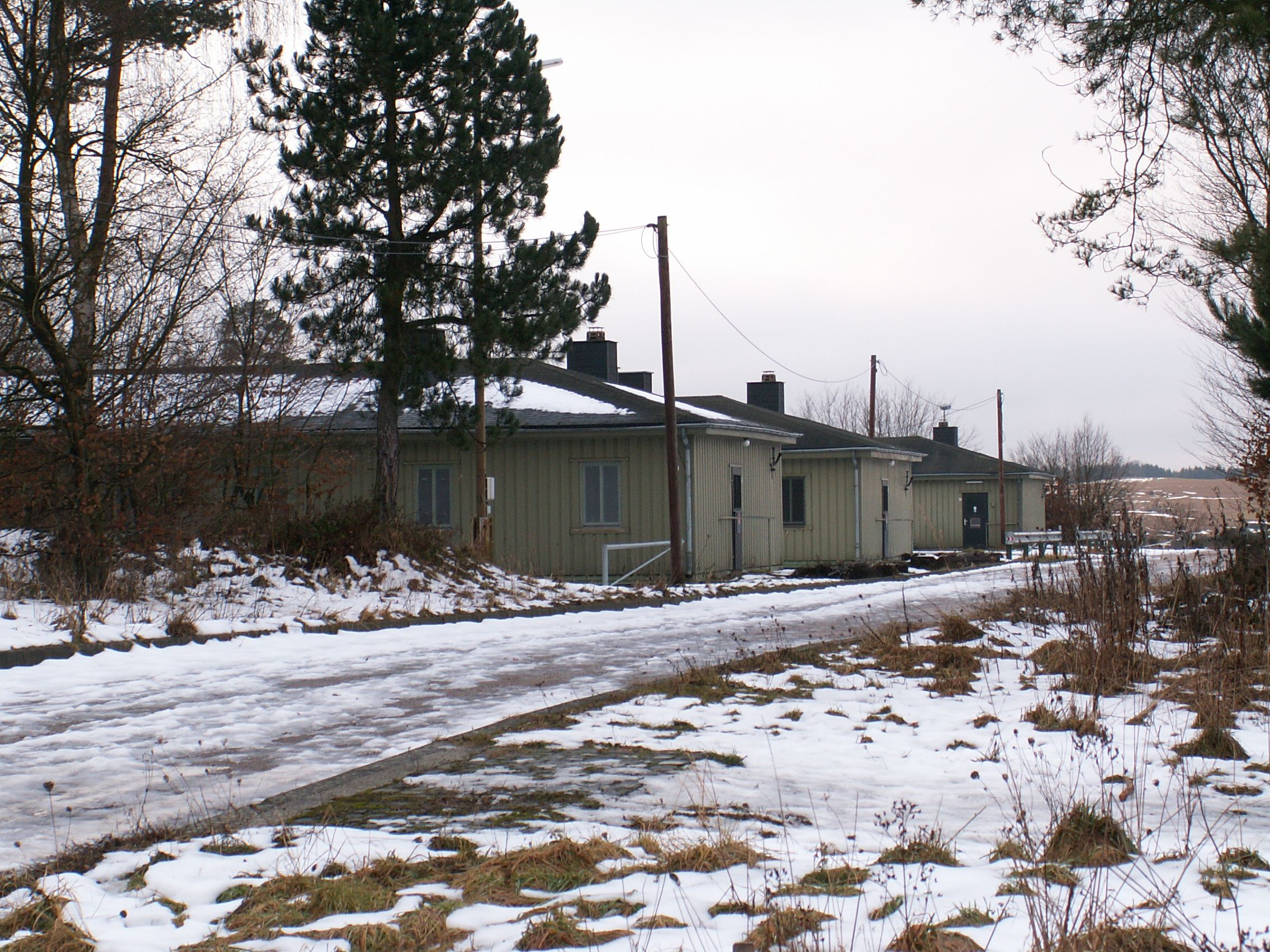
The Belgian barracks

From 1950 the Belgian forces used the terrain as a military training area, establishing, extending and equipping the original Nazi fort to create the Van Dooren Barracks. In 1989 the site came under heritage conservation protection.

The Belgian military left Vogelsang Camp in late 2005.

=== Use since 2006 ===
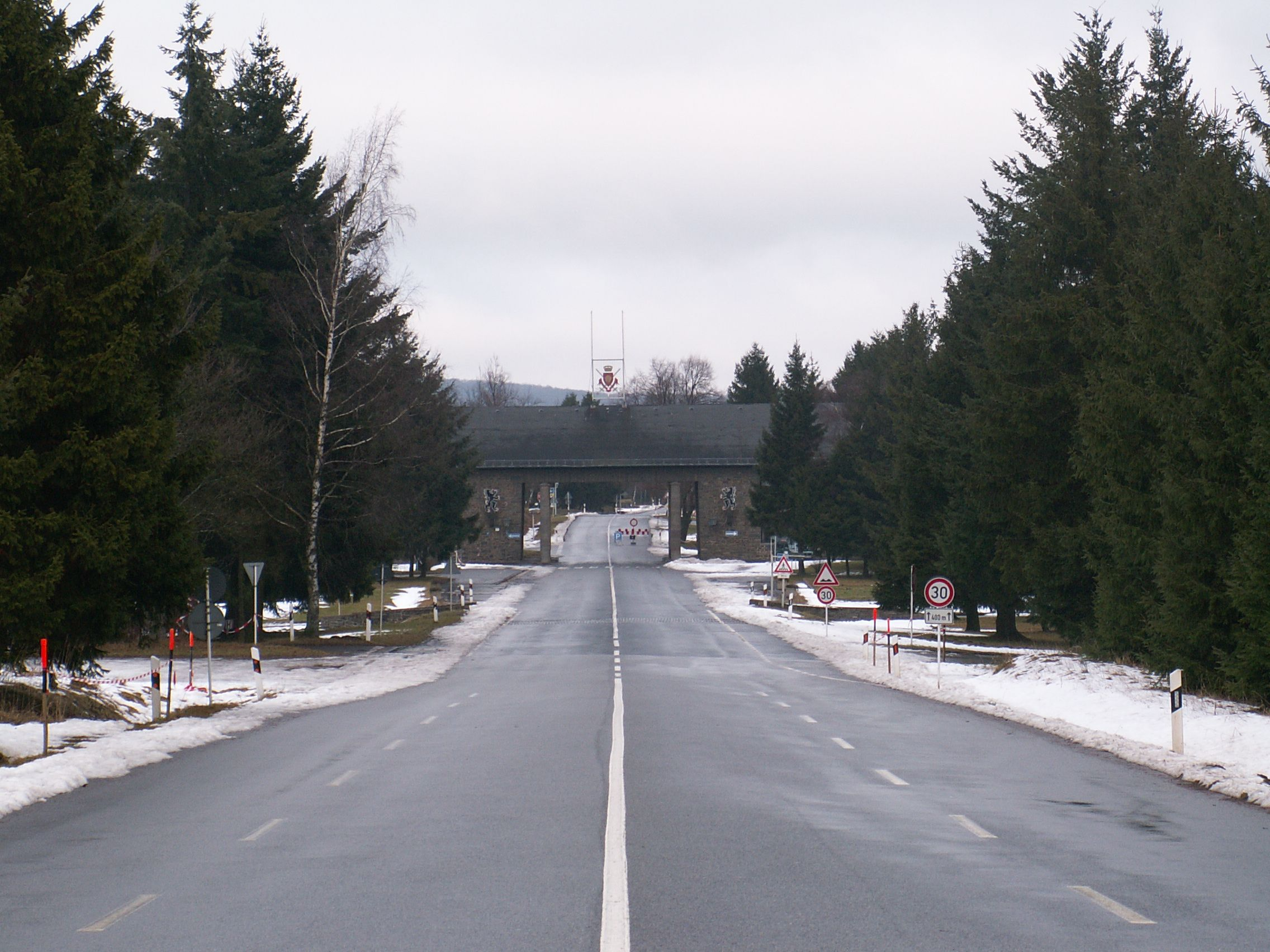
The approach road with a view of the Malakoff main gate will be made more attractive

At the beginning of 2006, ownership of the land was transferred from the Federal Republic of Germany to the state of North Rhine-Westphalia. The federation swapped, as part of a land consolidation process, the mainly forested land of the Vogelsang Military Training Area, which covered roughly 3,300 hectares, for an equivalent area of forest in the Eifel. However the risk of contamination left by the training area usage remains with the Federation, as in comparable cases, as part of the change-of-use agreement.

Since 1 January 2006, the area and its solid stone buildings have been open to the public and may be visited during the day. Part of the land is crossed by hiking trails, but walkers must not leave the paths (mainly due to uncleared munitions and for nature conservation reasons).

== Nature conservation ==
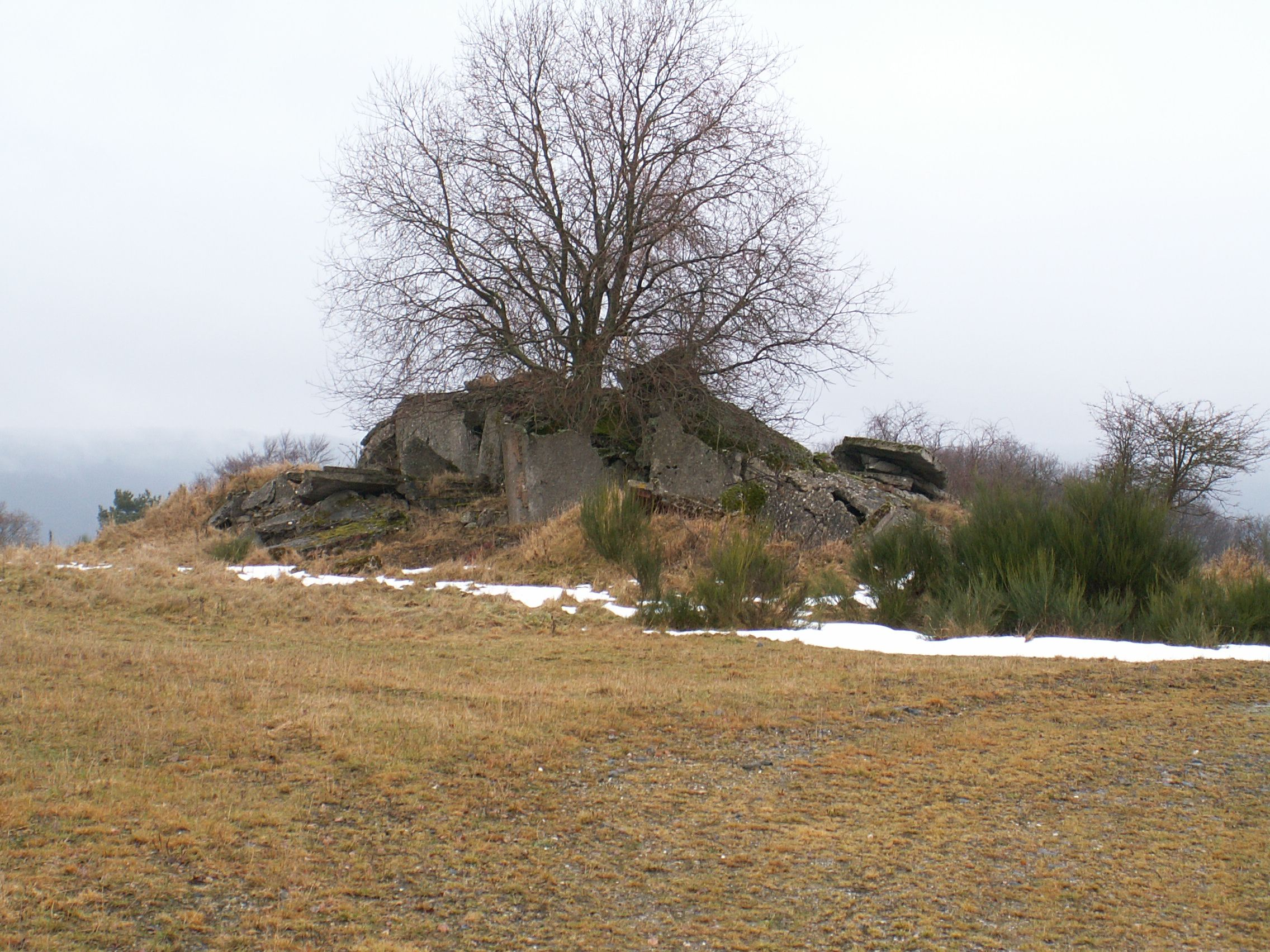
A blown-up bunker of the Westwall on the tank training area

For decades large areas of Vogelsang Training Area were only used by the military, but were otherwise largely untouched, and have therefore become natural wilderness. Today they are elementary components of the Eifel National Park and its conservation concept. As a result of very low human intervention since the 1950s, especially the lack of agriculture and forestry, a valuable range of flora and fauna has developed. For example, the wildcat occurs in the woods on the training area and, around the outer edges, the strictly protected red-backed shrike.

In addition to the open land and woods of the Dreiborn Plateau, small stream valleys with tall, herbaceous vegetation, accompanying alder woods and underwater vegetation are of ecological interest. The slopes are covered in places by species-rich sphagnum meadows and there are also unspoilt spring bogs with willow moss. The red deer is especially important in keeping the meadows clear of bushes.

Pollution is however still a problem, not only due to the use of the area after the war as a firing range and its more general use as a military camp, but also to a great extent due to spent ammunition, blinds and shrapnel left behind by firing carried out during the Second World War. Uncleared areas remain out of bounds to the public.

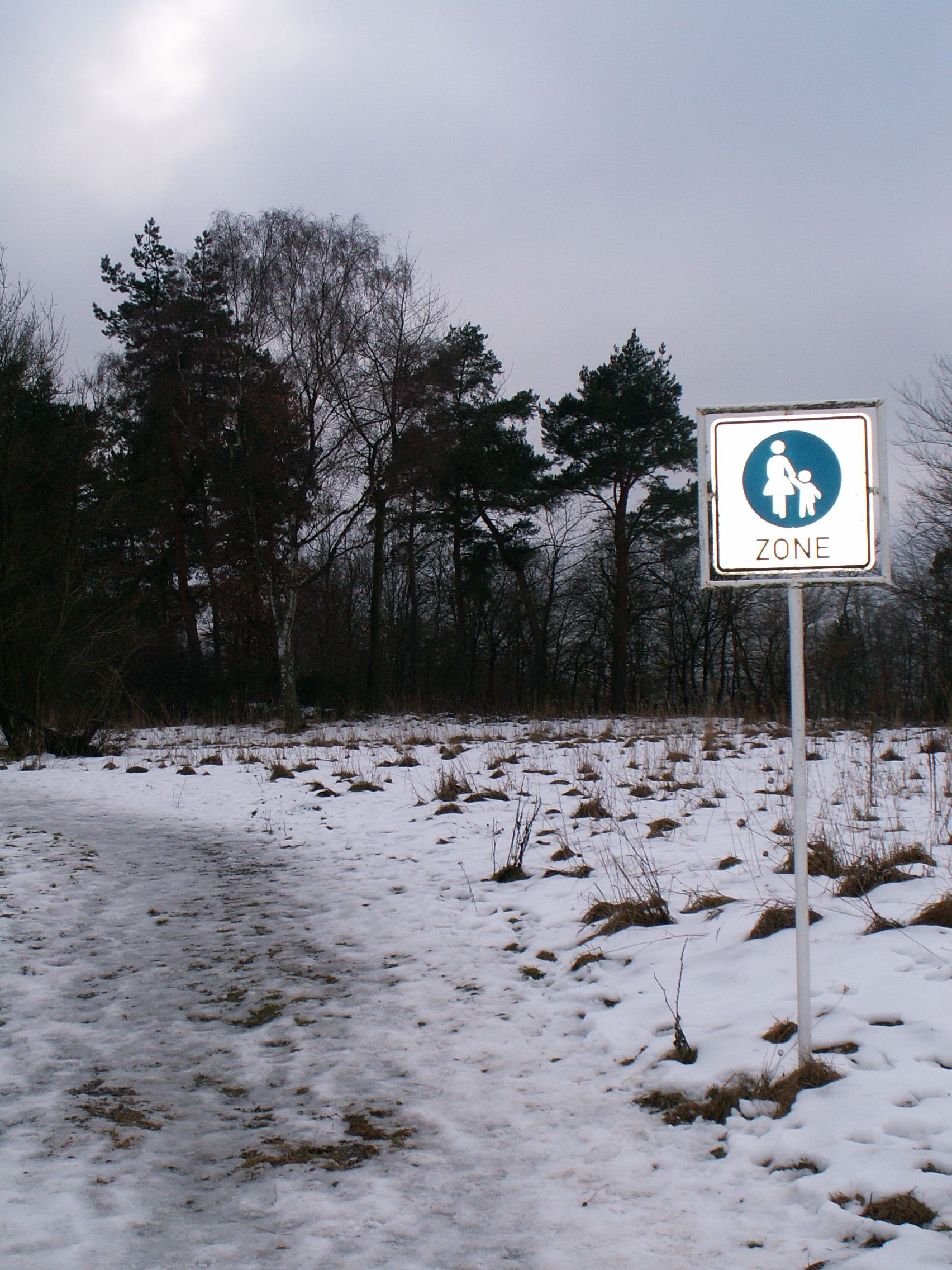
This forest path is open to the public

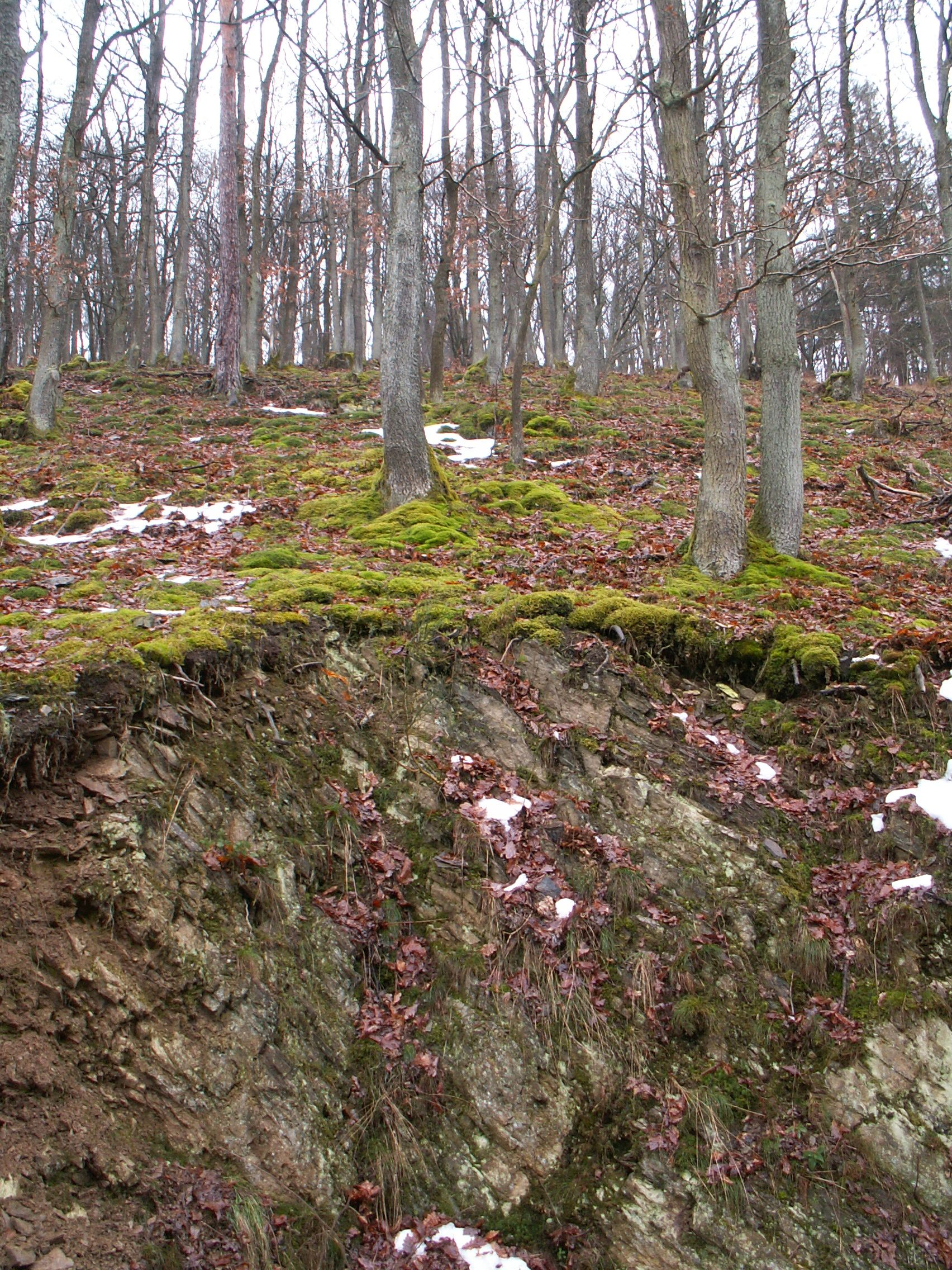
Young oak stand in the woods

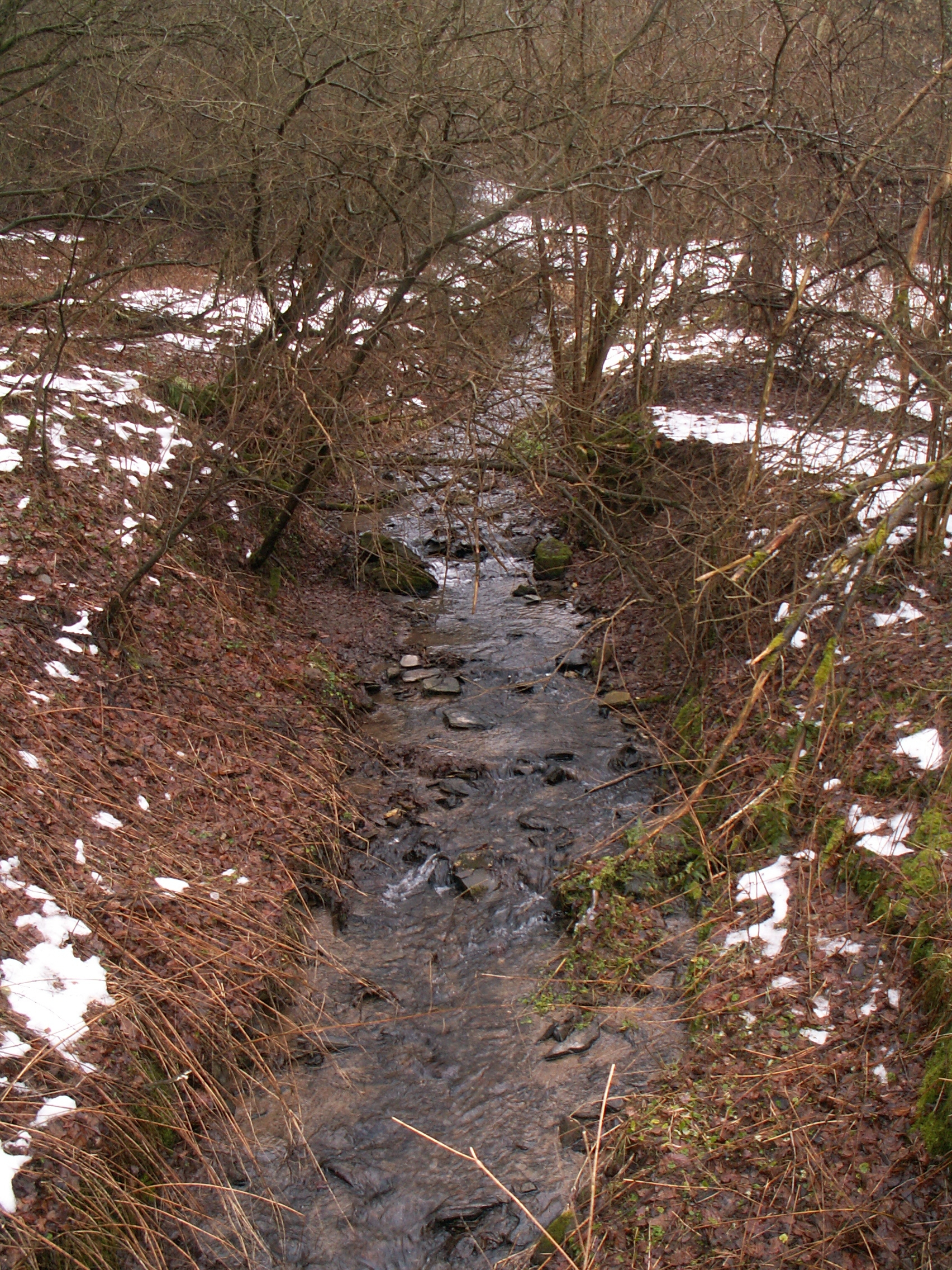
Near-natural stream

== Tourism ==
As well as the Nazi fort of Vogelsang, that is now the main attraction after being out of bounds to the general public for decades, the National Park and nature tourism also play a role in drawing visitors to the former training area terrain. One special place of interest is the abandoned village of Wollseifen, once a small hamlet on the Dreiborn Plateau that had to be evacuated when the training area was established in 1946.

Other places of interest are viewing points with wide views of the Urft Reservoir and valley, various military installations scattered over the out of bounds area and several ruined settlements like the former village of Vogelsang and other small hamlets. For example, at Jägersweiler there are several old farms and cottages (Kotten); the family of European champion aerobatic flyer, Liesel Bach, lived in one of the empty houses before it was cleared.

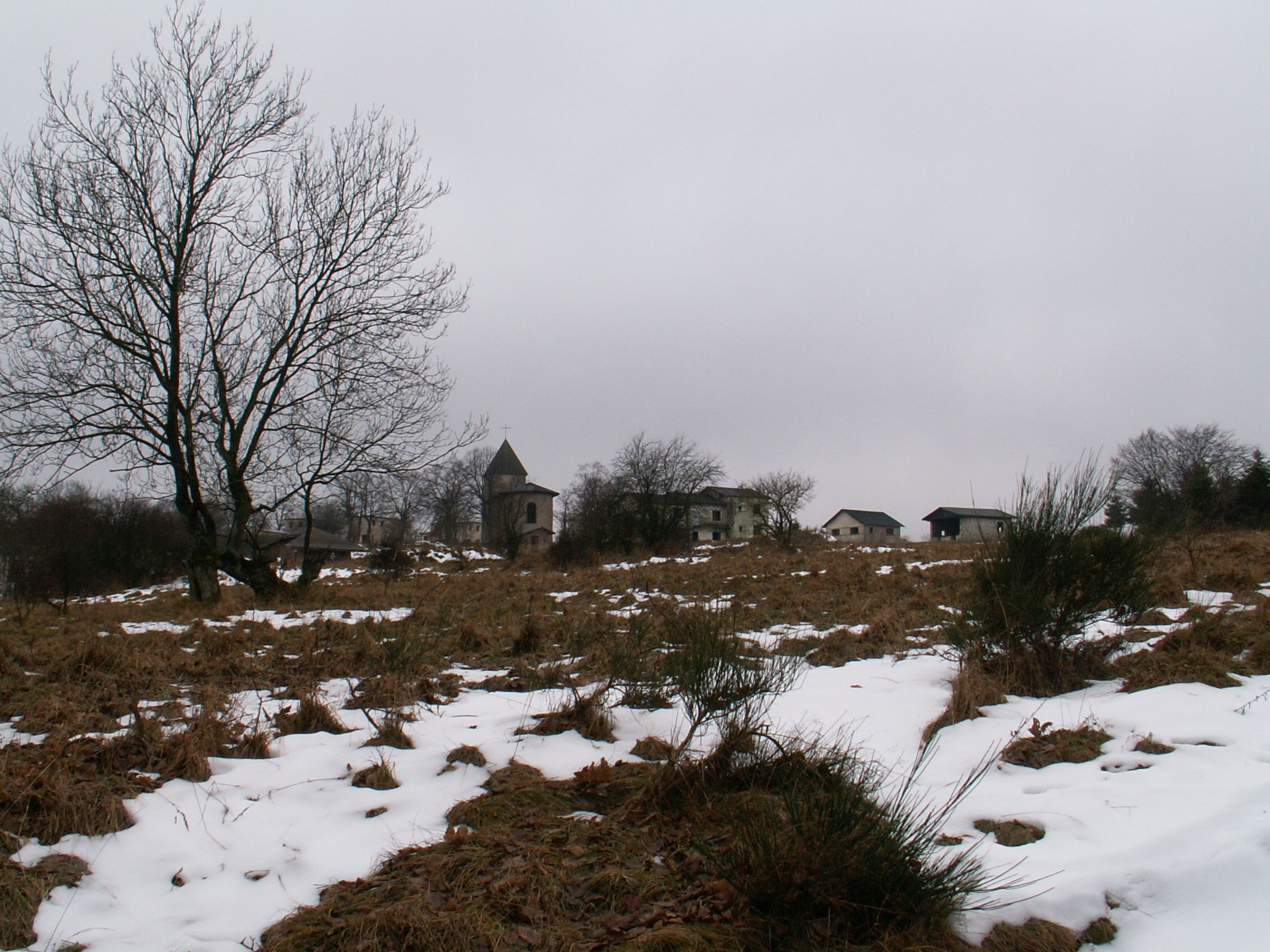
Wollseifen, the "ghost village"

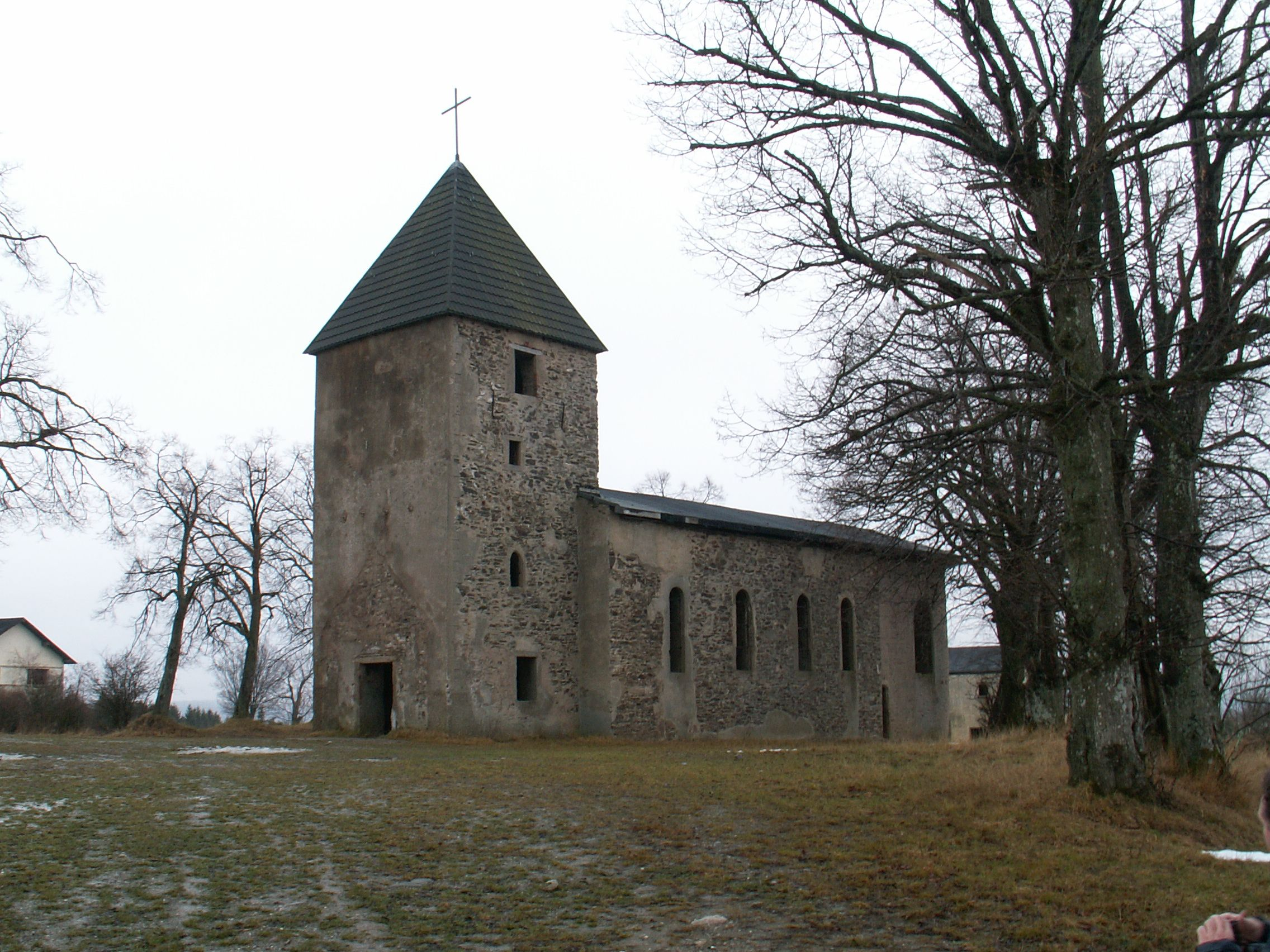
Wollseifen church

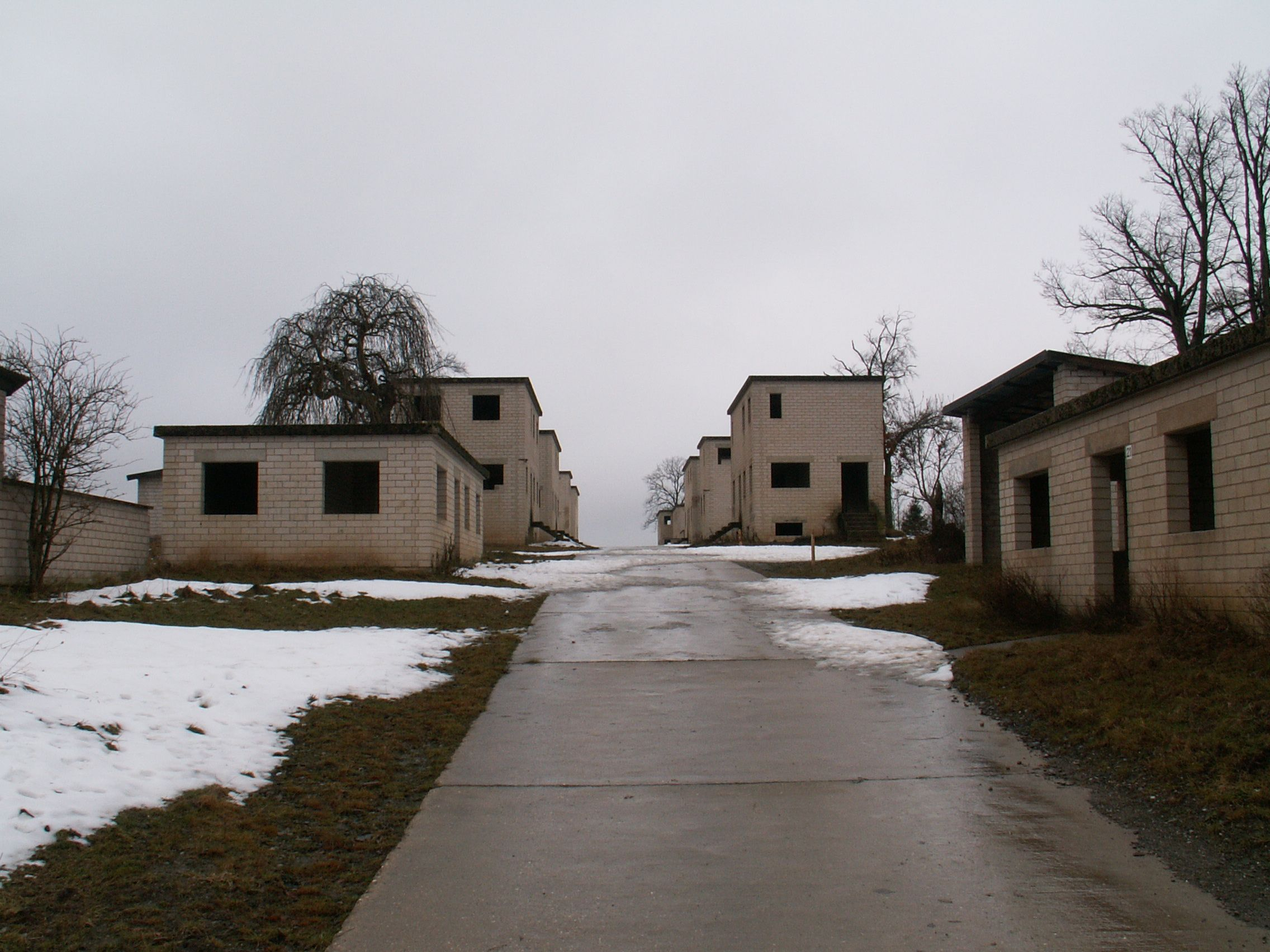
Houses built by the Belgians in order to conduct urban warfare training

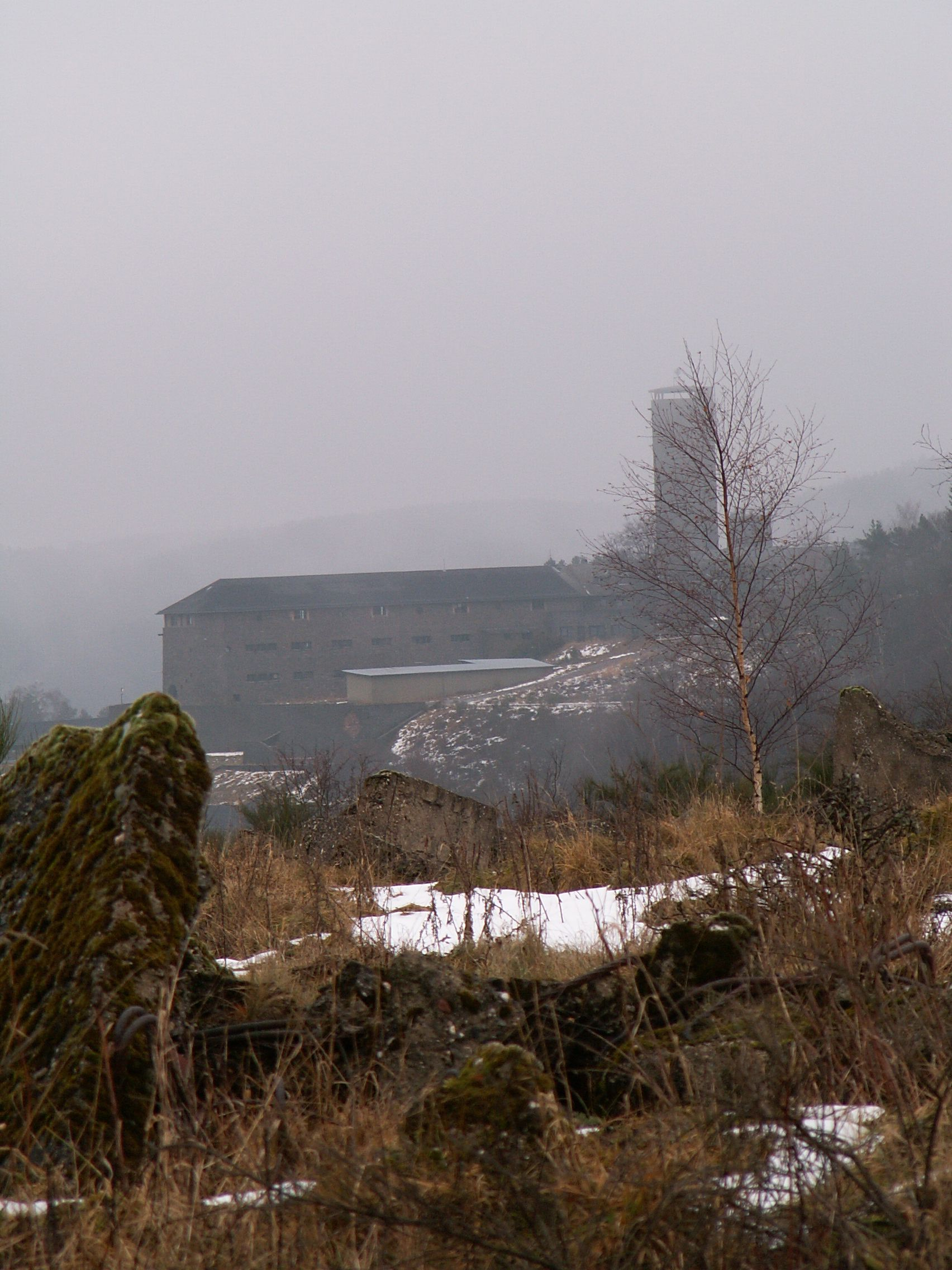
View of the fort from Wollseifen. Pollution in the foreground

== Literature ==
- Hans-Dieter Arntz: Vogelsang - Geschichte der ehemaligen Ordensburg. Helios-Verlag, Aachen 2008, ISBN 978-3-938208-71-7

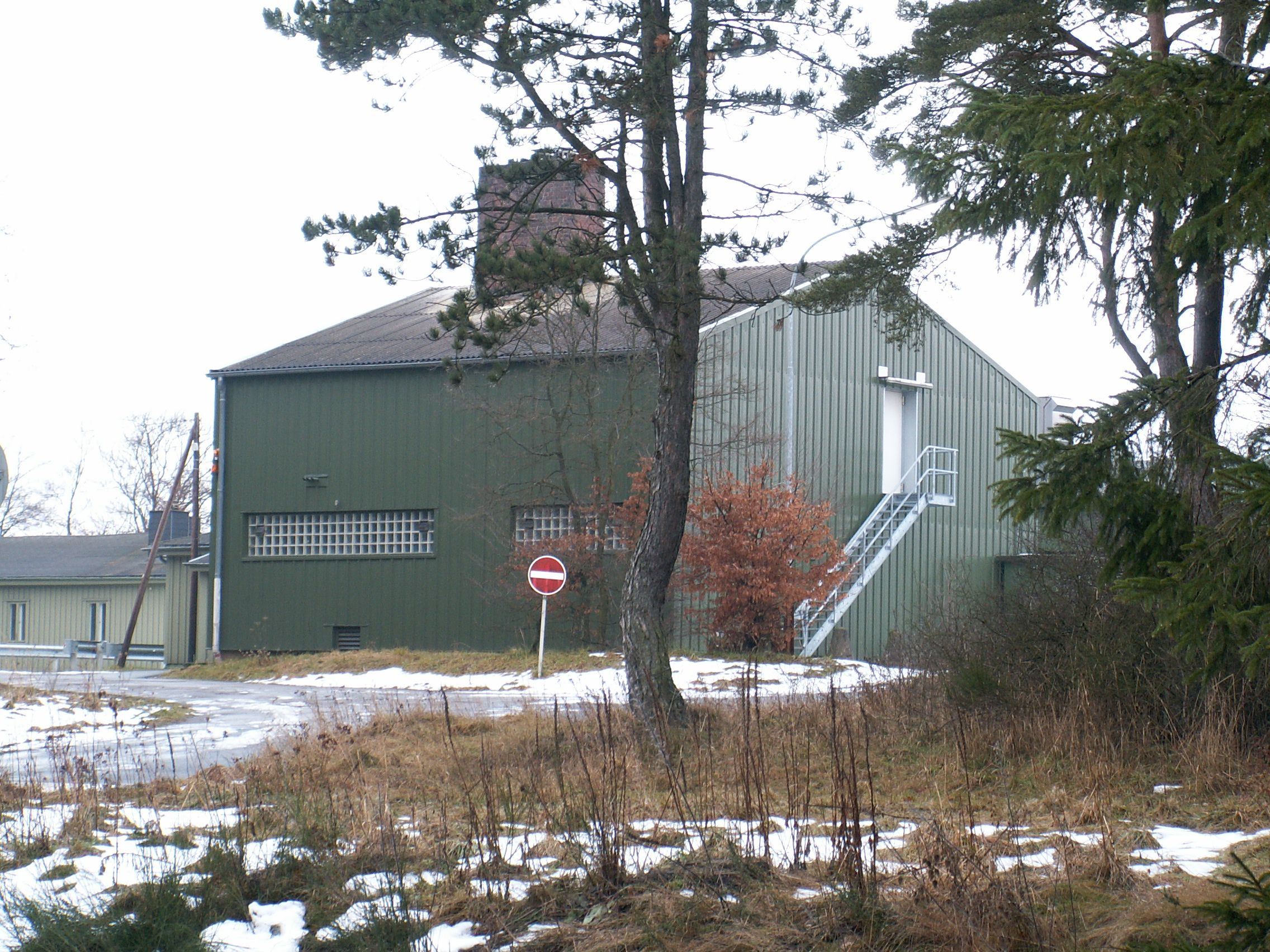
Boiler house built by the Belgians for the surrounding accommodation huts

- Franz Albert Heinen: Vogelsang - Von der NS-Ordensburg zum Truppenübungsplatz in der Eifel. Eine kritische Dokumentation. Helios-Verlag. Aachen. 2002.
- Franz Albert Heinen: Vogelsang. Im Herzen des Nationalparks Eifel. 2nd ed., Gaasterland-Verlag. Düsseldorf 2006, ISBN 3-935873-11-5
- Traditionsverein Wollseifen (Hg.): Wollseifen - Das tote Dorf. Schleiden. (Selbstverlag) o.J.

== External links and sources ==
- Overview at the National Park Association
- www.nationalpark-eifel.de (Leaflet on the Dreiborn Plateau, 2009)
- Natura 2000: Stream valleys in the Vogelsang Training Area
- The Bundeswehr on the NATO training area of Vogelsang/Eifel
- sdw-nrw.de - Background information on the NP Eifel and the Vogelsang Training Area
- verschiedene 360° panoramic view by Peter Braatz
- Wollseifen Society (on the history of Wollseifen)
- vogelsang-ip.de (Vogelsang Development Company)
