= Wildnis Trail =

German hiking trail

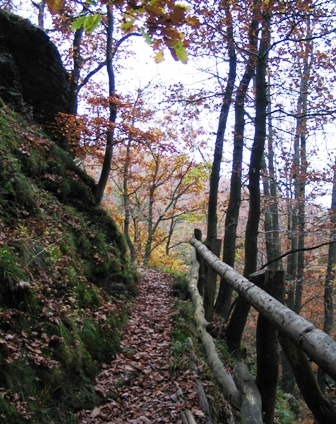
- Wilderness Trail near Leykaul
- Length: 85 kilometres (53 mi)
- Location: Eifel National Park, North Rhine-Westphalia, Germany
- Established: 2007
- Trailheads: Höfen, Zerkall
- Use: Hiking
- Highest point: Wahlerscheid 628 metres (2,060 ft)
- Lowest point: Zerkall 180 metres (590 ft)
- Season: Year round
- Sights: Ordensburg Vogelsang
- Website: http://www.nationalpark-eifel.de/go/eifel/english/Under_your_own_steam/Wilderness_Trail.html

The Wildnis Trail is a long-distance hiking path in the Eifel National Park in North Rhine-Westphalia, Germany. The path is 85 km long and leads through the entire national park from Southwest to Northeast. The trail brings the hiker through all different zones of the national park. These include forest, heath, grassland, artificial lakes and mountain streams.

== Stages ==
The national park proposes to complete the path in 4 one-day stages with each a length between 18 and 25 km.

- Höfen - Einruhr: 24,7 km
- Einruhr - Gemünd: 20,5 km
- Gemünd - Heimbach: 22,4 km
- Heimbach - Zerkall: 17,7 km
