= Castle Museum, Nideggen =

Local history museum in Germany

Coordinates: 50°41′20″N 6°28′38″E

- Burgenmuseum – Burg Nideggen
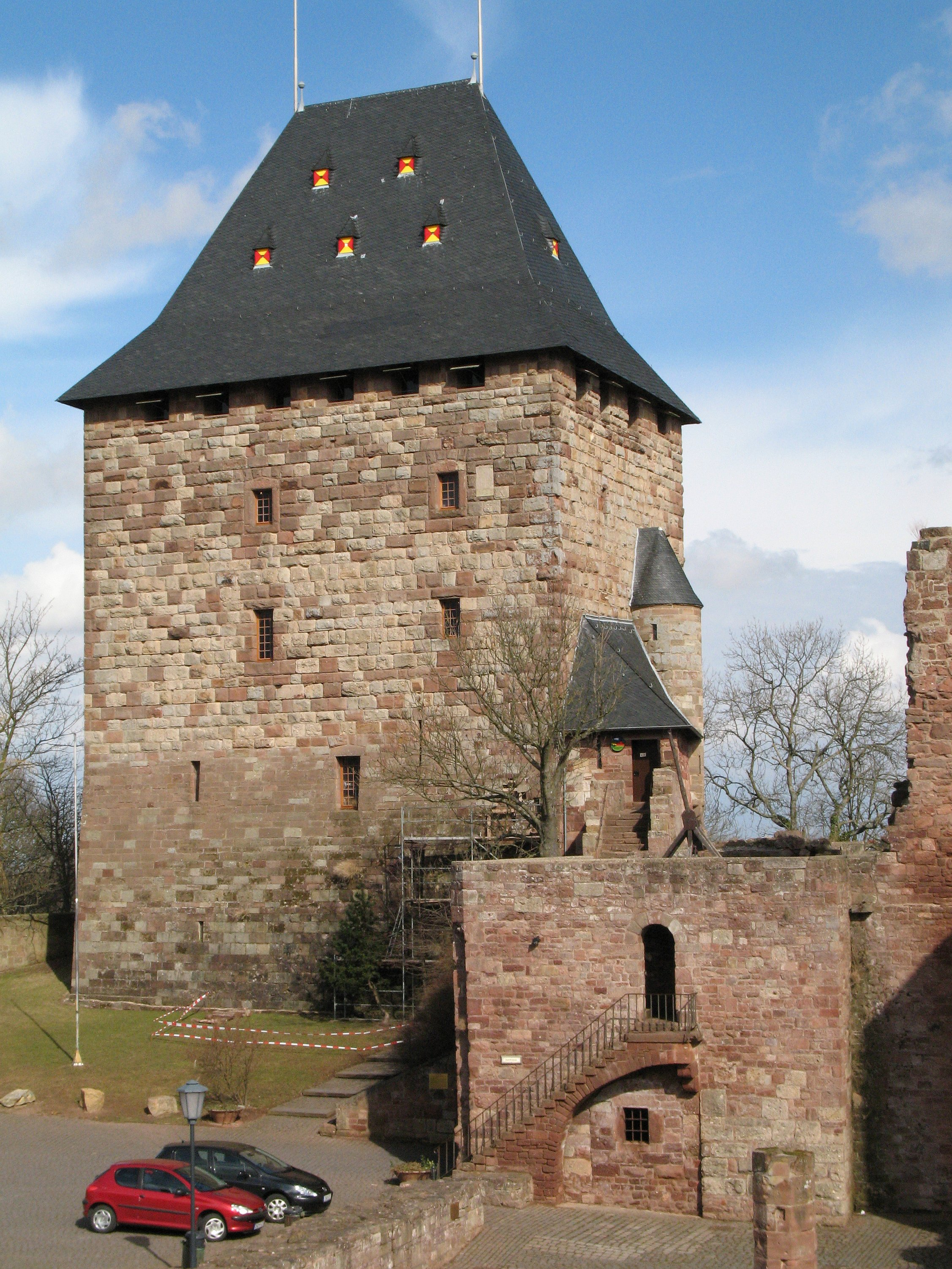
- The museum is situated in the bergfried
- Established: 27 September 1979
- Location: Nideggen
- Type: Local history museum
- Owner: County of Düren
- Website: www.kreis-dueren.de/burgenmuseum/

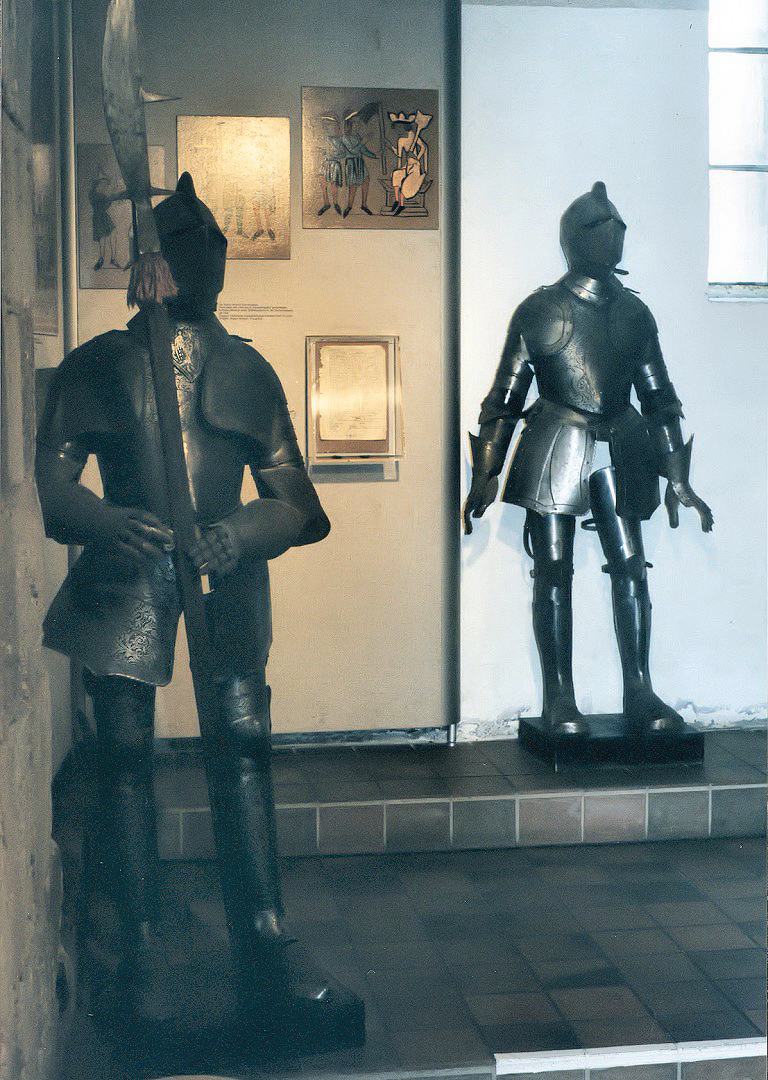
Armour in the museum

The Castle Museum (German: Burgenmuseum) is located in Nideggen Castle in the county of Düren, in the German state of North Rhine-Westphalia.

== History ==
In 1898, the county of Düren received Nideggen Castle. Around 1922 the Local History Museum of Düren County and the Town of Nideggen (Heimatmuseum des Kreises Düren und der Stadt Nideggen) was established in the fighting tower or bergfried. In the Second World War the tower was used by artillery units as an observation post. The tower house suffered a direct hit during an air raid on 6 December 1944 and much of it collapsed. After extensive rebuilding, the castle museum was re-opened on 27 September 1979.

== Museum ==
The museum is housed in eight rooms on several floors within the tower. Here there are models of castles in the Eifel mountain region between the rivers of the Moselle and Rhine and the German border. The exhibits include suits of armour, halberds and swords. Methods of torture and interrogation, medieval justice and incarceration are explained. In one room the economic system of the Middle Ages, for example, feudalism in the Holy Roman Empire, tithing and tithe stones (Zehntsteine), are explained. In the cellar, the dungeon can be seen in which the archbishops of Cologne, Conrad of Hochstaden and Engelbert II of Falkenburg were imprisoned.

On the fifth floor visitors can enjoy long-distance views as far as the Cologne area.

== Literature ==
- Klaus Ring: Eifeler Burgenmuseum im Bergfried der Burg Nideggen. In: Burgen und Schlösser. Jg. 20, No. 2, 1979, ISSN 0007-6201, p. 128.
- Franz-Josef Brandenburg: Das 1. Burgenmuseum der Eifel, in Jahrbuch 1998 Kreis Düren, p. 97, ISBN 3-927312-25-8
