= Nideggen Castle =

German castle

- Burg Nideggen
- Nideggen
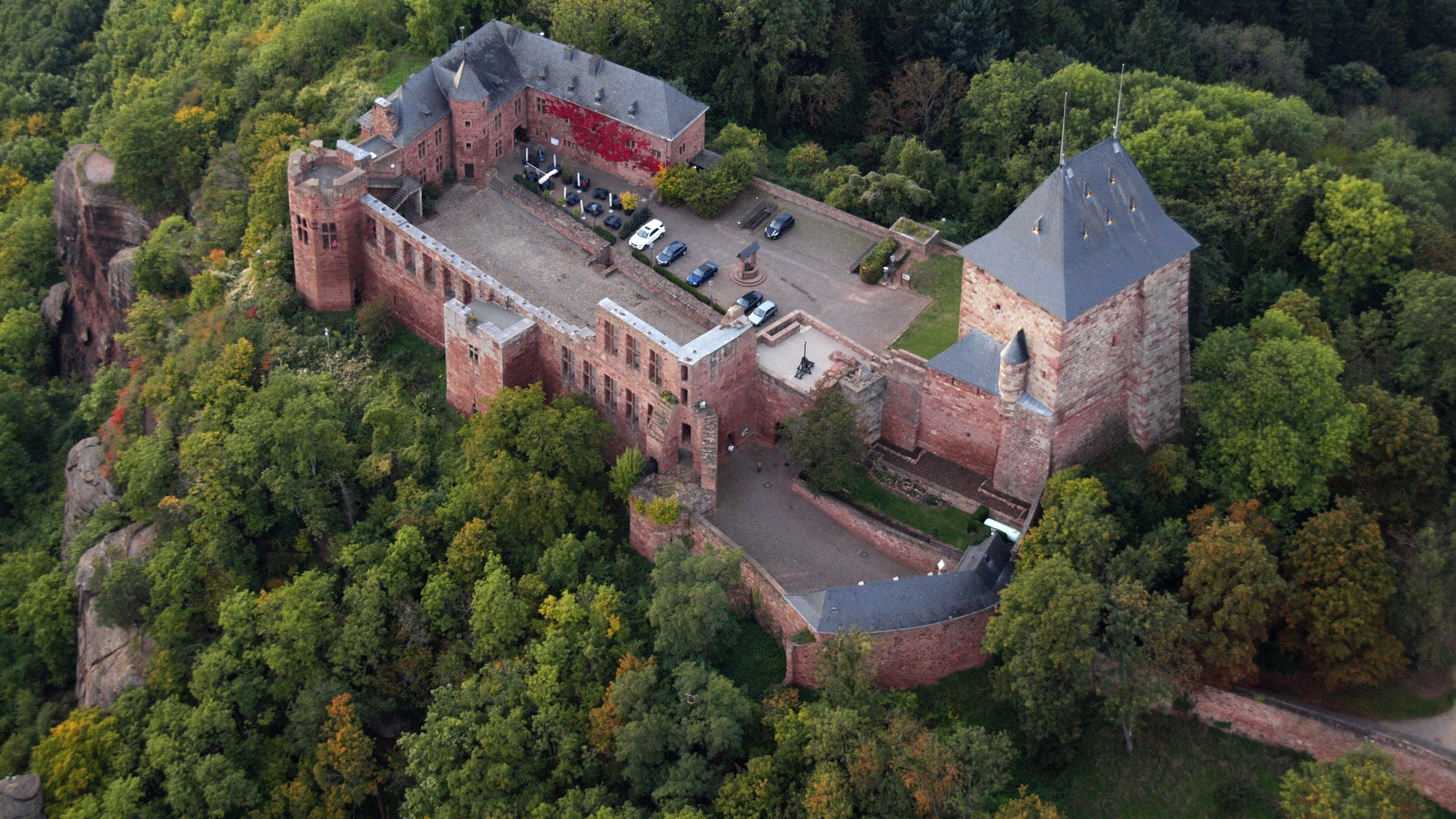
- Aerial photograph of the castle

Site information
- Type: hill castle
- Code: DE-NW
- Condition: preserved or largely preserved

Location
- Location within North Rhine-Westphalia Location within Germany
- Coordinates: 50°41′19″N 6°28′38″E
- Height: 330 m above sea level (NHN)

Site history
- Built: 1177
- Materials: rubble stone

Garrison information
- Occupants: counts

The ruins of Nideggen Castle (German: Burg Nideggen) are a symbol of the town of Nideggen in Germany and are owned by the county of Düren. The rectangular hill castle was the seat of the powerful counts and dukes of Jülich and had a reputation in the Middle Ages of being impregnable.

== History ==
Nideggen Castle was built by the counts of Jülich in the strategically important border area of the then Herrschaft ("Lordship") of Monschau. It was intended to protect the inherited territory of the counts against the interests of the archbishops of Cologne.

The foundation stone for the castle was laid in 1177 by William II on the construction of the bergfried, which was erected within sight of the imperial castle of Berenstein. It was located about three kilometres to the west and was built around 1090. After its almost complete destruction around 1200, it served as a quarry for the extension of Nideggen's castle tower. The yellowish ashlar blocks of the Berensteins differ markedly from the red-coloured sandstone blocks forming the lower half of the tower, which were broken at Nideggen.

Construction work was continued by William III. Like his ancestors, his successor was also at odds with the Electorate of Cologne. In 1242, after a successful battle, William IV left the then Archbishop, Conrad of Hochstaden for nine months in the dungeon of the keep. But he was not the only one who got to know the walls of that dark prison. A few years earlier (around 1214), Duke Louis of Bavaria had to "make his quarters there". Conrad's successor to the throne of the Archbishopric of Cologne, Engelbert II of Falkenburg, was also held captive there by the Jülich counts for more than three years in the period from 1267 to 1271.

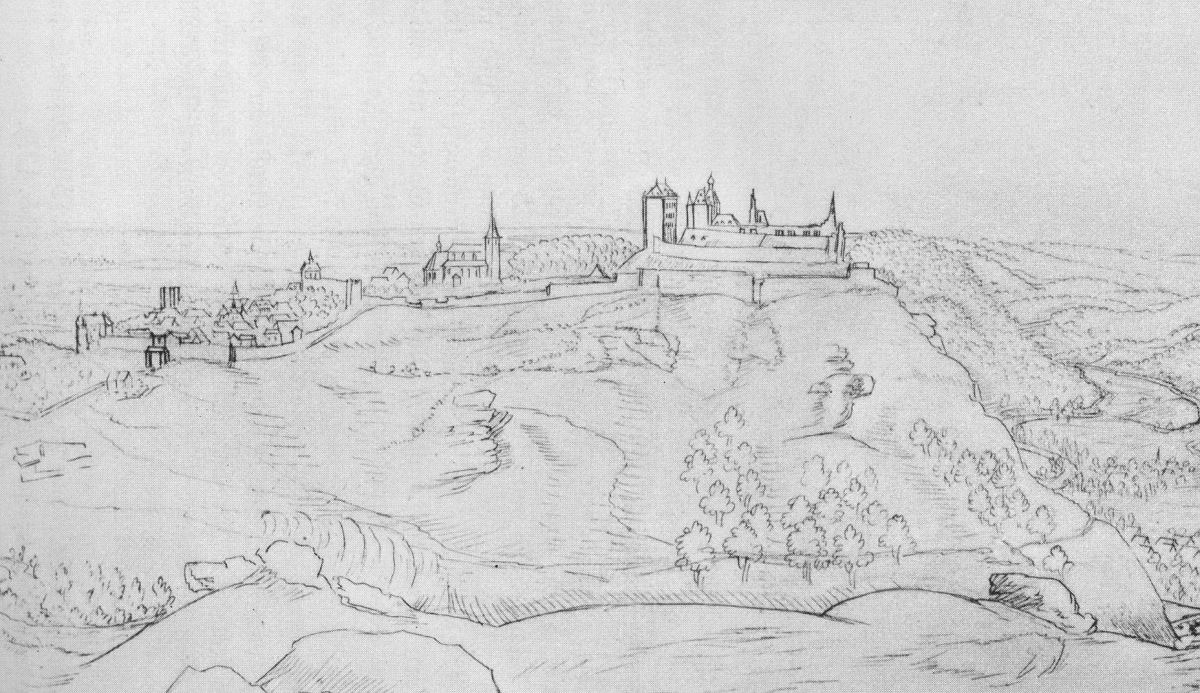
Nideggen Castle in the first half of the 18th century; drawing by Renier Roidkin

Under Gerhard of Jülich, the settlement of Nydeckin was founded near the Burgflecken. Gerhard granted Nideggen town rights in 1313.

William V, later Duke William I started to extend the castle in 1340, the palas at Nideggen being one of the largest castle halls built in the Rhineland. In the late Middle Ages, only the Emperor's hall of Aachen Town Hall and the Gürzenich in Cologne approached similar dimensions. William I was also the one who made Nideggen Castle his family seat in 1356.

After the death of Rainhald of Jülich, the castle went to the family of the dukes of Berg, whose heads from then on called themselves the Dukes of Jülich and Berg.

With the extinction of the House of Jülich and Berg in 1511, Nideggen went into the possession of the Duchy of Cleves.

Hereditary disputes between the House of Cleves and Emperor Charles V over the Duchy of Geldern culminated in the Guelders Wars (also known as the Jülich feud), in the course of which the castle and town of Nideggen were destroyed by imperial artillery in 1542.

In 1689, the castle suffered a similar fate. During the War of the Palatine Succession, troops under Louis XIV once again looted and burned it down. Earthquakes in 1755 and 1878 did the rest. The castle fell into ruins, was seized by the French and was sold by them in 1794 for demolition. It was subsequently used as a quarry.

It was only on the initiative of the Nideggen townsfolk that an end was put to this. The castle was bought jointly and secured in 1888. In 1905, the county of Düren was given the castle as a gift. It is still in their possession today.

From 1901, the castle was rebuilt for the first time and used as a museum of local history, but attacks during World War II caused unprecedented damage to the building structure. Reconstruction did not begin until the 1950s. The first steps have been taken to ensure that the Romanesque parish church of the castle site is restored. The tower house was then restored in its original form and became home to the first castle museum in North Rhine-Westphalia in 1979.

== Description ==
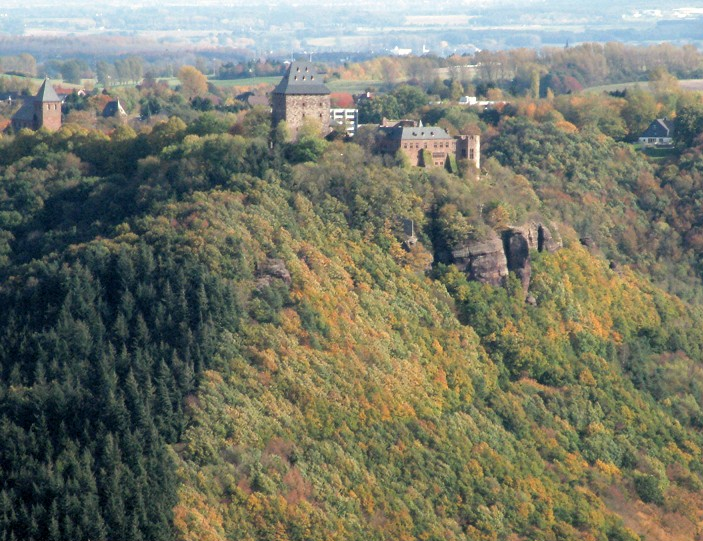
West view of the castle

=== Castle garden ===
The square castle garden is enclosed by walls and was built after the Middle Ages. A gate in the north-western corner of the wall led to the Burgflecken. In the middle of the west side stood a house from the Baroque period, which has not survived. It had walls linking it to the outer castle gate.

=== Outer gate with zwinger and gatehouse ===
The outer castle gate, built in the 14th century, served as an entrance to the smaller, outer courtyard of the castle, which at the same time had the function of a zwinger. In the 16th century the gate building was replaced. It was not until the 18th century that the entrance was covered by a two-storey, south-east-facing building timber-framed house. This so-called gateman's house (Pförtnerhaus) was reconstructed in 1979 after having been destroyed during the Second World War. Today it is used by the Düren branch of the German Alpine Club and Nideggen Mountain Rescue Team.

=== Inner castle gate (main gate) ===
The late Romanesque gate building has been the only access to the main castle since time immemorial. It is connected to the donjon of the castle by a curtain wall. After the gate had been destroyed by wars and earthquakes, it was rebuilt between 1901 and 1906 and extended with a staircase on the west side.

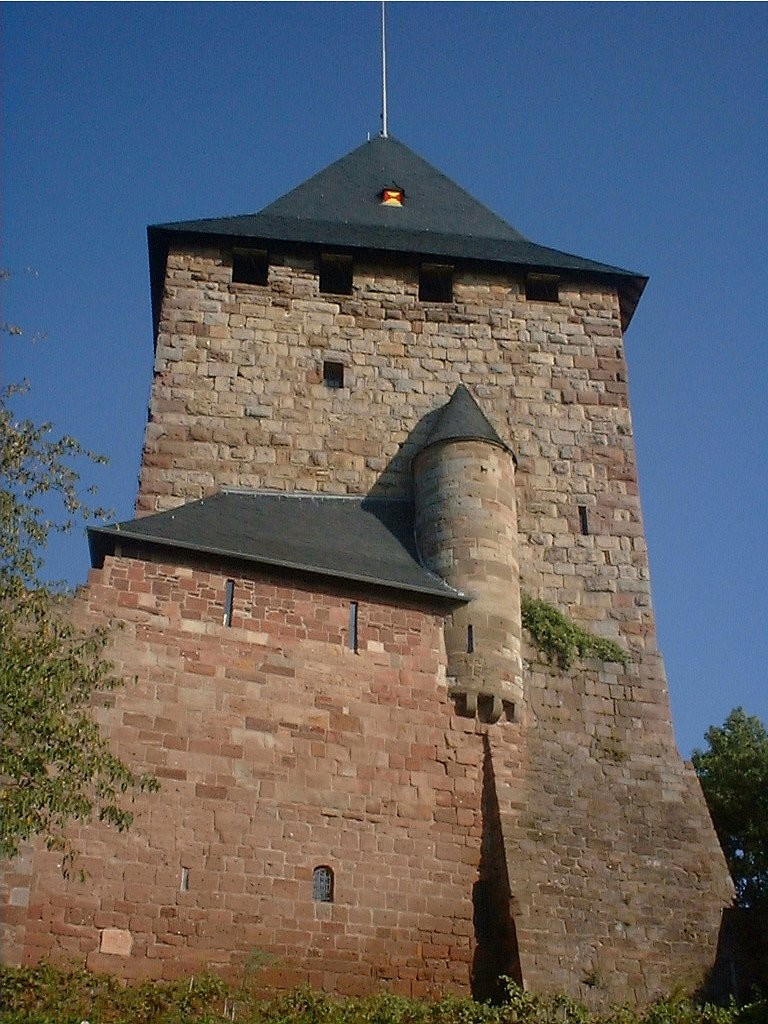
Tower house of the castle

=== Tower house ===
Built between 1177 and 1190, the tower house is the oldest part of Nideggen Castle. On its eastern side is a deep neck ditch. Around 1350, the tower was increased in height to six storeys. Inside, the castle chapel is on the ground floor, next to the dungeon. The remaining floors each have two rooms which, in addition to living quarters, were used as storerooms and garrison rooms (Mannschaftsräume).

The tower was heated and had toilets from its early days. To be able to defend it well, its elevated entrance on the south side was well above ground level and could only be reached by ladder. Only when the main gate and the enceinte had been built, were the present ground-level entrance and a staircase tower built. After the roof had been sold for scrap at the turn of the 18th century, the brickwork suffered great damage in the period that followed and this was not rectified until 1906. From 1925 to 1944, the donjon housed a local history museum. After severe damage in the Second World War, it was rebuilt in 1954 and 1955 and furnished with a roof again in 1979. Since then, it has housed the first castle museum in North Rhine-Westphalia.

=== Palas ===
With a length of 61 metres and a width of 16 metres, the palas was the largest hall building on a German castle of the 14th century. Both on the ground floor and on the upper floor, it housed a two-nave hall with twelve large cross-windows. On its west and east side it is flanked by two octagonal side towers. At the north-western corner of the palas there was originally a staircase tower, on whose foundations stands the small tower of today's restaurant. Remains of columns are still to be found in the middle of the hall building, as well as remains of walls indicating the former location of the north wall. In the front wall was a secondary staircase to the upper floor. Below the palace there are cellar vaults, some of which are filled in. Among other things, they served as a kitchen.

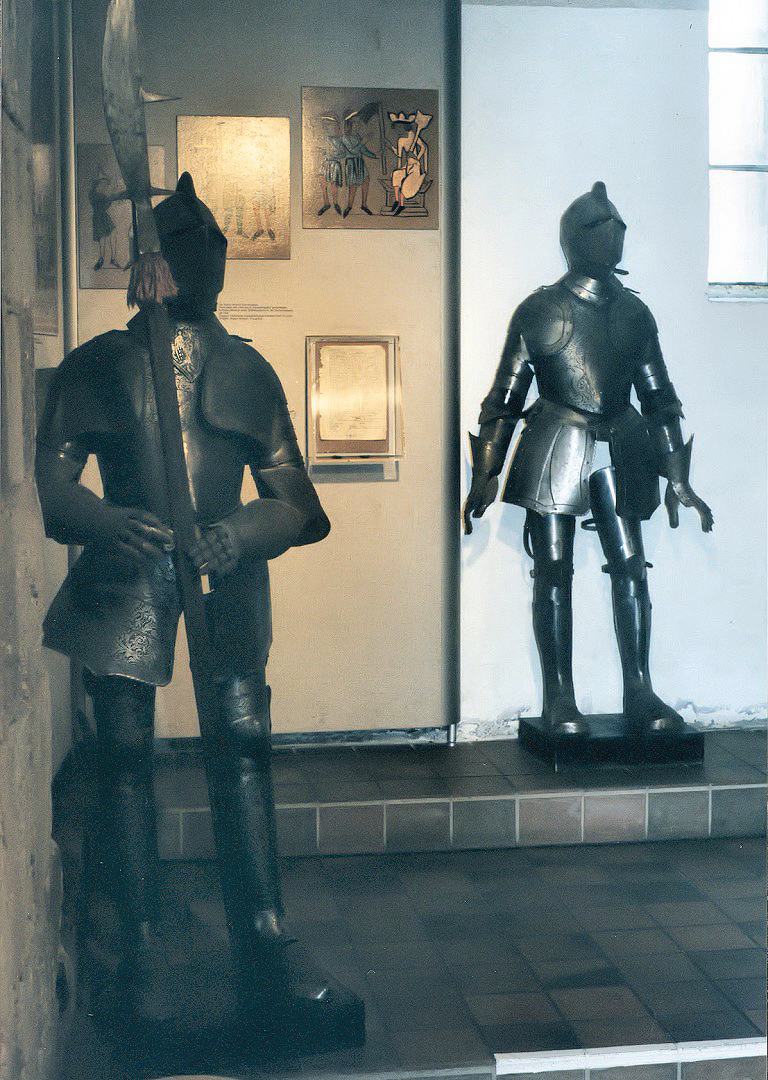
Exhibition at the Castle Museum

=== Kitchen tower ===
The east flank of the palas is protected by an octagonal tower from the middle of the 14th century, whose height until 1944 was still 14 metres. Fragments of a staircase, which presumably led to the top of the tower, have survived. The lower floor served as a storeroom. Primarily, however, the tower had to fulfil defensive functions, as indicated by its very small window apertures.

=== West Tower (so-called Damenerker) ===
The West Tower with its large windows also consists mainly of 14th century buildings and served representative purposes. Inside, there are remains of a chimney, which is why the cabinets are also found here for the female members of the count's family.

=== Well ===
The castle well partly followed a natural crevice and was once 95 metres deep. Since 1945, however, it has only been about 30 metres.

=== Buildings on the west and north side ===
The appearance of the buildings that used to stand on the west and north side of the castle is largely unknown. The present ones were rebuilt between 1901 and 1906 on old foundations. After their destruction in the Second World War, they were rebuilt again between 1948 and 1950. Today the castle restaurant is located here.

== Castle museum ==
The Castle Museum opened in 1979 in the castle's tower house. It offers a glimpse of the Eifel region, which is rich in castles, through its exhibitions which cover an area of approximately 600 square metres. These enable the visitor to learn interesting facts about the function and the cultural significance of castles, as well as life in a medieval castle. In addition, they cover regional historical topics such as the important noble families of the Eifel and the history of the Duchy of Jülich.

== Festival ==
In the summer, the county of Düren used to hold annual festivals at Nideggen Castle until 2010. In 2011, the festival venue moved to Schloss Merode.

== Literature ==
- Wilhelm Avenarius: Burg Nideggen. In: Alte Burgen schöne Schlösser. Eine romantische Deutschlandreise. Gekürzte Sonderausgabe. Das Beste, Stuttgart, 1980, ISBN 3-87070-278-8, pp. 154–155.
- Walter Lonn: Neubau an der Ruine Burg Nideggen. In: Burgen und Schlösser. Jg. 20, No. 2, 1979, ISSN 0007-6201, pp. 129.
