= Liesel Bach =

German aviator (1905–1992)

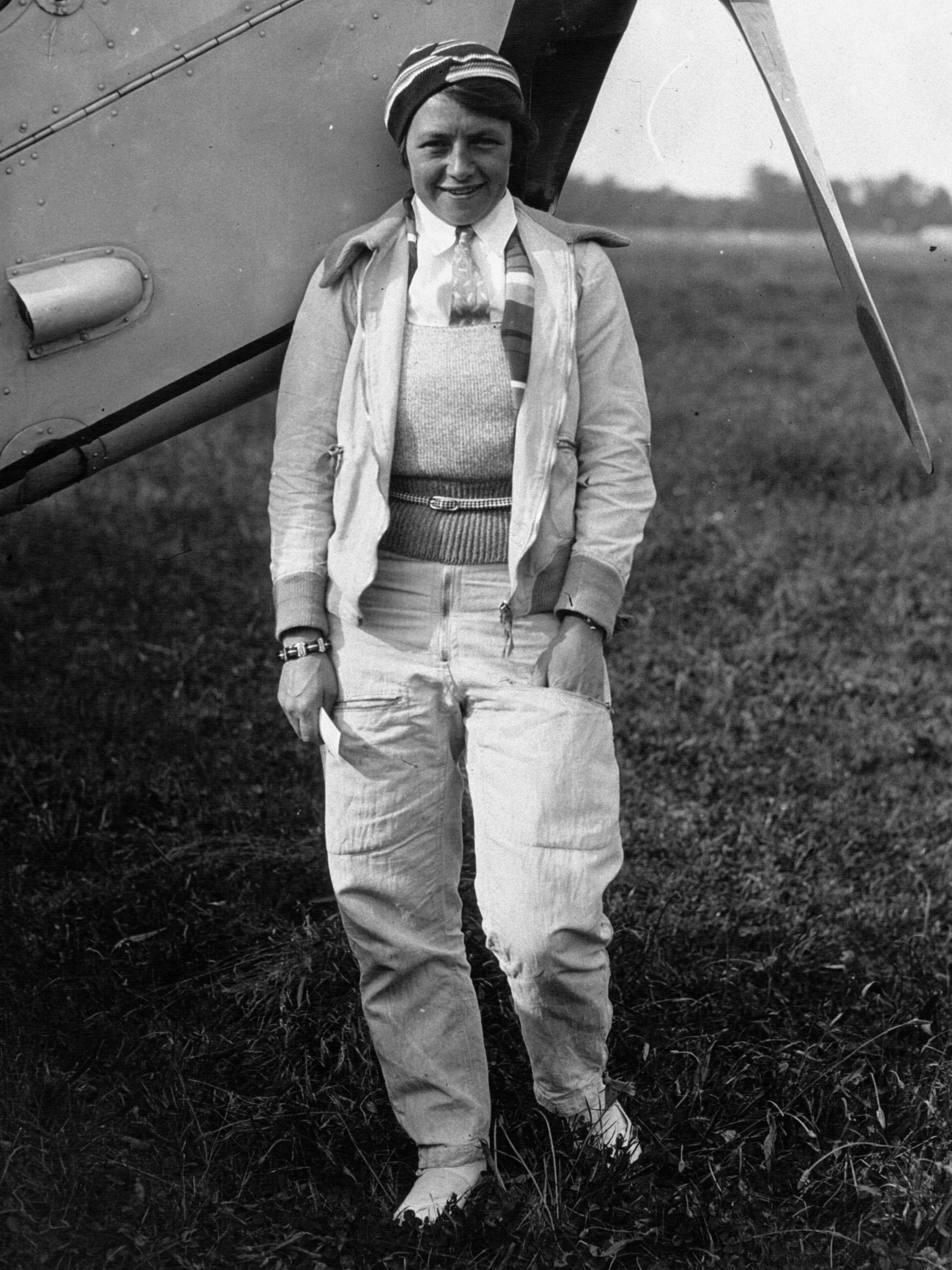
Liesel Bach in 1932

Liesel Bach (14 June 1905 – 22 January 1992) was a German aerobatic pilot and flight instructor. She was the first woman to fly over Mount Everest.

== Biography ==
Bach was born in Bonn, Germany, on 14 June 1905. Her first interest in aviation was in gliding, which she learned as member of the Hangelaer Aviation Association. In 1929, a flight instructor from Cologne landed at Hangelaer with a student pilot and Bach asked him if he would teach her to fly. He agreed, and Bach started lessons with him at s Butzweilerhof Airport in Cologne a short time later. In November that year, she earned her pilot's license. She immediately began learning aerobatics and, in April 1930, passed her aerobatics license test and also won a German aerobatic flying competition. She went on to compete in other aerobatic competitions, including an international meeting in Milan, Italy, in 1930, during which Luzie Byczkowsky parachuted from her plane, and another in Zurich, Switzerland, in 1932, where she was placed fourth. She also competed in the IV International Flugmeetings contest in Zürich in August 1937. She was also a frequent performer at demonstration events for Butzweilerhof Airport. In 1931, she gained her flight instructor's license.

In March 1932, Bach was asked to fly a plane pulling a propaganda sign for Adolf Hitler, who was standing in the 1932 presidential election. Colleagues of hers threatened sabotage and exclusion from the airport if she agreed to this, but she and two other pilots accepted the request and flew over Cologne with the election banner "Choose Hitler!" This action was greatly criticised by many people at the time. In 2006, a suggestion to name a street in Cologne after her was rejected because of this incident, which was seen as showing support for Hitler. Her name was given to a street in Flugfeld area in Böblingen in 2012.

During World War II, recreational flying was banned and Bach was instead assigned to an air transport squadron. She was responsible for transferring aircraft from manufacturing plants to airfields and bases.

In December 1950, Bach was invited to India by the Indian government. She was initially based at Chaudhary Charan Singh International Airport in Lucknow and, in 1951, she competed in an international aerobatics competition at Kanpur, at which she won first place. In the same year, she flew over the Himalayan mountains, thus becoming the first woman to fly over Mount Everest. In 1952, Bach successfully defended her international aerobatics title at a competition in Sri Lanka. In 1953, she returned to Germany, driving her Ford Taunus car from India back to Cologne. The Indian prime minister, Jawaharlal Nehru, expressed his thanks to her for deepening German-Indian relations.

In Cologne, Bach continued to fly as an aerobatic pilot and, in 1981, was instrumental in founding a leisure flying club in the city. In 1986, she was given honorary membership of the newly opened aviation museum at Butzweilerhof Airport.

Bach moved to Bandol, in the south of France, on her retirement. She died there on 22 January 1992.
