= Nideggen =

- Town
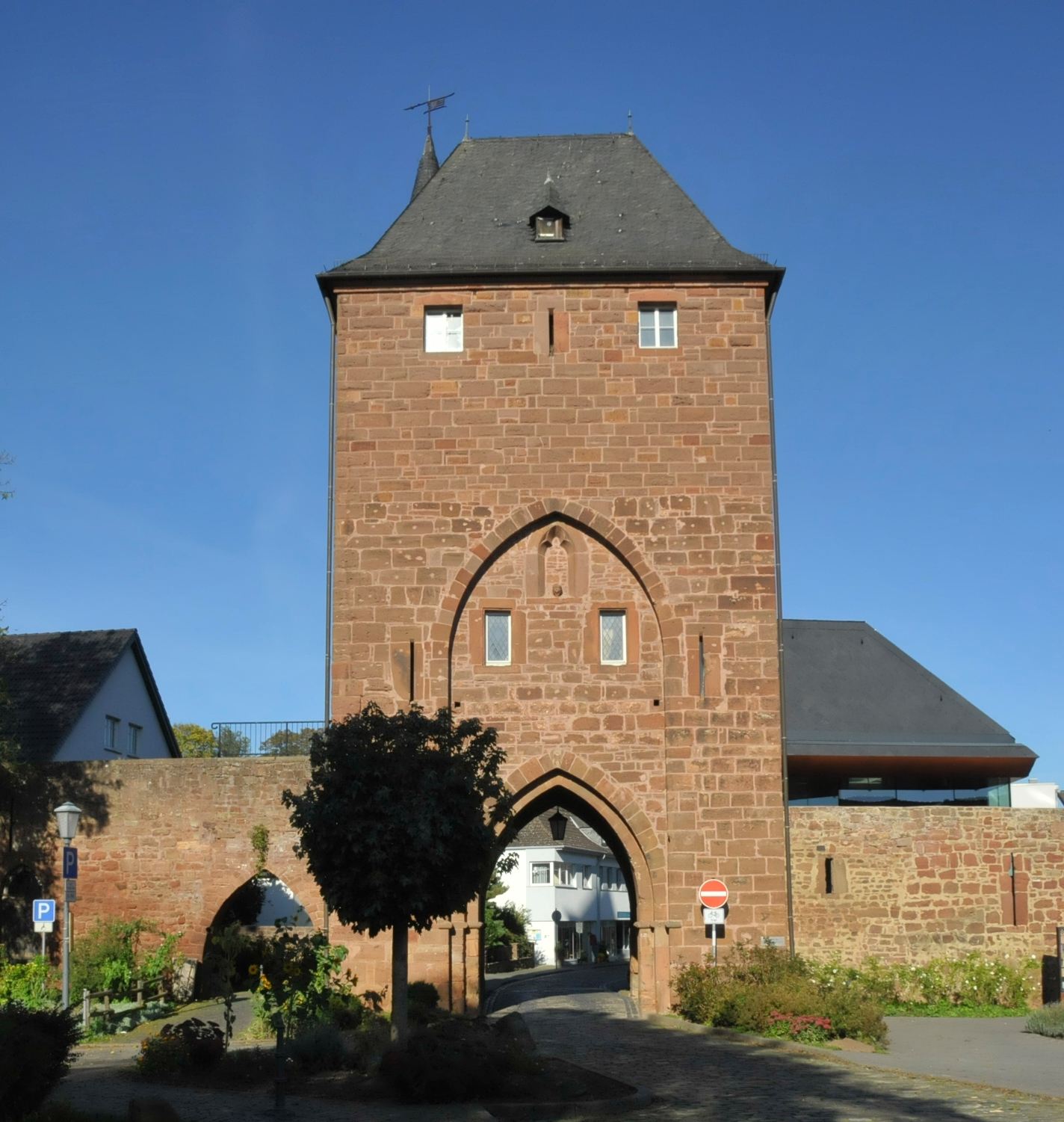
- Town gate – the Zülpicher Tor

- Coat of arms

- Location of Nideggen within Düren district
- Interactive map of Nideggen
- Location within Germany Location within North Rhine-Westphalia
- Coordinates: 50°42′N 06°29′E
- Country: Germany
- State: North Rhine-Westphalia
- Admin. region: Köln
- District: Düren
- Subdivisions: 9

Government
  - Mayor (2025–30): Marco Schmunkamp (Ind.)

Area
  - Total: 65.04 km^{2} (25.11 sq mi)
- Elevation: 304 m (997 ft)

Population (2025-12-31)
  - Total: 10,704
  - Density: 164.6/km^{2} (426.2/sq mi)
- Time zone: UTC+01:00 (CET)
  - Summer (DST): UTC+02:00 (CEST)
- Postal codes: 52385
- Dialling codes: 02425, 02427, 02474
- Vehicle registration: DN, JÜL
- Website: www.nideggen.de

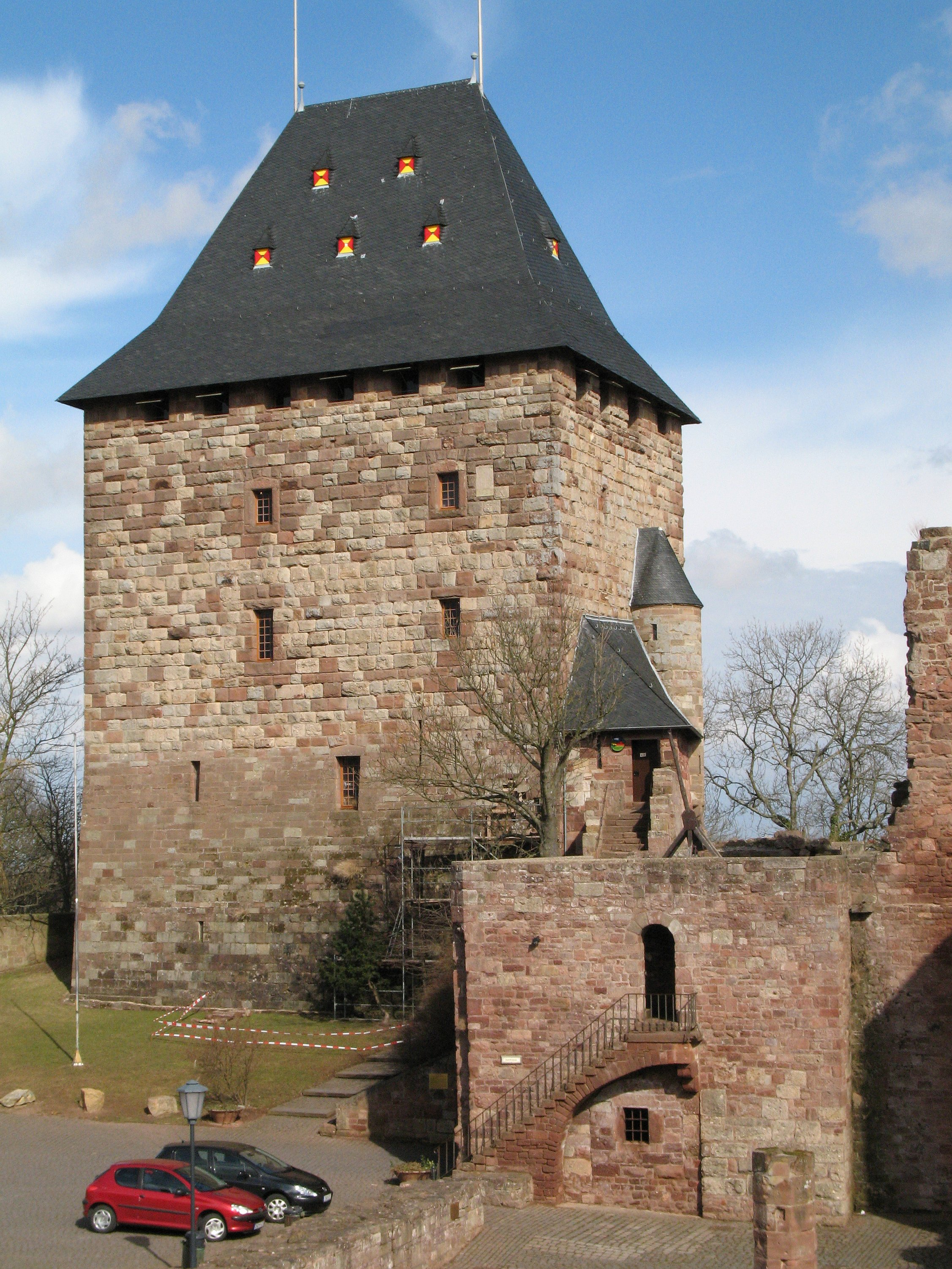
Restored keep of Burg Nideggen

Nideggen (German: [ˈniːdɛɡn̩]) is a town in the district of Düren in the state of North Rhine-Westphalia, Germany. It is located on the river Rur, in the Eifel hills, approx. 15 km south of Düren.

Nideggen is known for its ruined, but partly restored castle (Burg Nideggen) and the sandstone rocks along the Rur. It is twinned with Thatcham in Berkshire, England. The first mention in history was in 1184.

The town was created in 1972 by amalgamation of eight until then independent communities: Abenden (782 inhabitants), Berg-Thuir (709), Brück (301), Embken (734), Muldenau (161), Nideggen (2,983), Rath (757), Schmidt (2,974), Wollersheim (637) (December 2014). It is situated between 250 and 450 metres above sea level.

== Geographical position ==
Nideggen lies on the river Rur and at the banks of the Rurtalsperre, the second largest dam in Germany. The region is famous for its precipitous Early Triassic rocks of Buntsandstein in the valley of Rur and is situated between 250 and 450 metres over sea level.

== Population ==
Historical population

Year	Pop.	±% p.a.
1965	6,032	—
1970	6,578	+1.75%
1975	7,133	+1.63%
1980	7,626	+1.35%
1985	8,133	+1.30%
1990	8,717	+1.40%
1995	9,675	+2.11%

Year	Pop.	±% p.a.
2000	10,573	+1.79%
2005	10,752	+0.34%
2010	10,625	−0.24%
2015	9,893	−1.42%
2020	10,155	+0.52%
2025	10,704	+1.06%

Source: Landesdatabank Nordrhein-Westfalen

== Museums ==
In the municipally owned Nideggen Castle is the unique Castle Museum of the Rhineland. The Düren Gate (Dürener Tor), one of the symbols of the town, hosts regular art exhibitions.

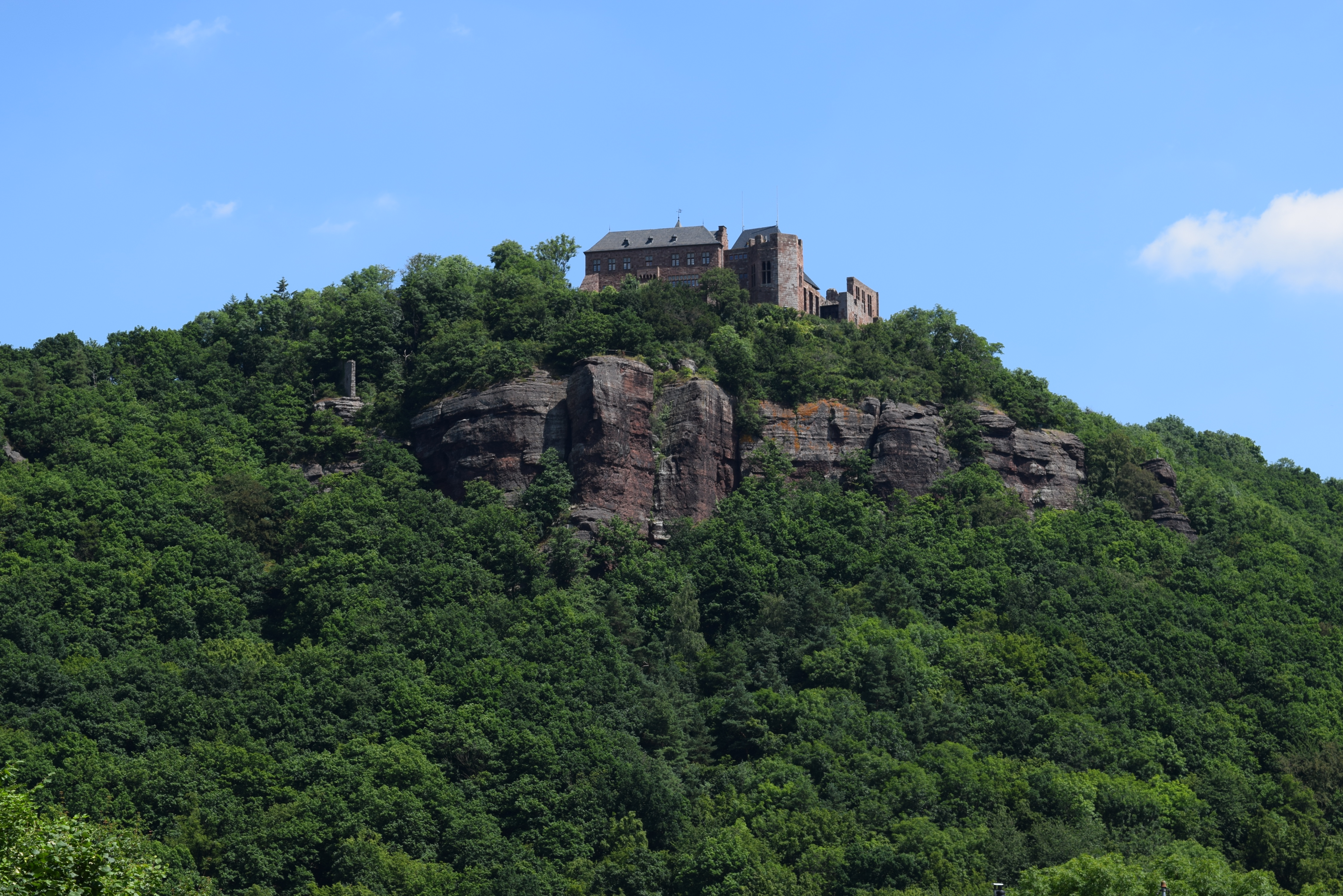
The castle high above the Rur valley (2016)
